= List of Phi Theta Kappa chapters =

Phi Theta Kappa is an international honor society for students seeking associate degrees, bachelor's degrees, or other college credentials. Most of its chapters are at community, junior, and other two-year colleges. In the following list of chapters, active chapters are indicated in bold and inactive chapters and institutions are in italics.

Chapter	Charter date	Institution	Location	State or territory	Status	Ref.
Alpha (First)	1918–1931	Hardin College	Mexico, Missouri	Missouri	Inactive, Reassigned	
Beta (see **Alpha Second**)	May 2, 1918 – 1931	Stephens College	Columbia, Missouri	Missouri	Renamed	(Note: Chapter formed from Kappa Phi Omicron, established in 1910.)
Gamma	1918–19xx ?	Christian Female College	Columbia, Missouri	Missouri	Inactive	
Delta	1918–1926	Howard–Payne Junior College	Fayette, Missouri	Missouri	Inactive	(Note: Chapter went inactive when the college closed.)
Epsilon	1918–19xx ?	Cottey College	Nevada, Missouri	Missouri	Inactive	
Zeta	1918–1921	Lindenwood College for Women	St. Charles, Missouri	Missouri	Inactive	(Note: Chapter formed from Kappa Phi Omicron, established in 1912. Its Phi Theta Kappa charter was withdrawn when the college became a four-year institution.)
Eta	1918–19xx ?	William Woods College	Fulton, Missouri	Missouri	Inactive	(Note: Chapter formed from Rochester Public Junior College, now Rochester Community & Technical College.)
Theta	1918–1925	Central Female College	Lexington, Missouri	Missouri	Inactive	
Iota	1925–1928	Fulton Female Synodical College	Fulton, Missouri	Missouri	Inactive	
Kappa	1926–19xx ?	St. Joseph Junior College	St. Joseph, Missouri	Missouri	Inactive	
**Lambda**	June 28, 1926	Mineral Area College	Park Hills, Missouri	Missouri	Active	(Note: Chaptaer formed at Flat River Junior College, now called Mineral Area College.)
**Mu**	December 11, 1926	Northeastern Oklahoma A&M College	Miami, Oklahoma	Oklahoma	Active	(Note: Chapter formed at Northeastern Oklahoma Junior College, which became Northeastern Oklahoma A&M College in 1943.)
Nu	1926–19xx ?	Virginia Intermont College	Bristol, Virginia	Virginia	Inactive	
Xi	1926–1929	New River State School	Montgomery, West Virginia	West Virginia	Inactive	
**Omicron**	January 1, 1926	Rochester Community and Technical College	Rochester, Minnesota	Minnesota	Active	
Pi	1927–19xx ?	Central College	Conway, Arkansas	Arkansas	Inactive	(Note: College closed in 1950.)
Rho	1928–19xx ?	Lon Morris College	Jacksonville, Texas	Texas	Inactive	
Sigma	1928–1931	Martha Washington College	Abingdon, Virginia	Virginia	Inactive	
Tau	1929–19xx ?	Wentworth Military Academy and College	Lexington, Missiouri	Missouri	Inactive	
Upsilon	1929–19xx ?	Whitworth Female College	Brookhaven, Mississippi	Mississippi	Inactive	
**Phi**	April 25, 1929	Weatherford College	Weatherford, Texas	Texas	Active	
**Alpha Beta**	November 17, 1929	Santa Ana College	Santa Ana, California	California	Active	
**Alpha Delta**	May 1, 1930	Hopkinsville Community College	Hopkinsville, Kentucky	Kentucky	Active	
**Alpha Epsilon**	May 23, 1930	Murray State College	Tishomingo, Oklahoma	Oklahoma	Active	
**Alpha (Second)** (see Beta)	1931	Stephens College	Columbia, Missouri	Missouri	Active	
**Alpha Kappa**	January 13, 1967	Borough of Manhattan Community College	New York City, New York	New York	Active	
**Alpha Mu**	May 19, 1930	Texas Southmost College	Brownsville, Texas	Texas	Active	
**Alpha Omicron**	November 12, 1930	Tyler Junior College	Tyler, Texas	Texas	Active	
**Alpha Tau**	April 7, 1931	Moberly Area Community College	Moberly, Missouri	Missouri	Active	
**Beta Alpha**	May 2, 1931	Blinn College	Brenham, Texas	Texas	Active	
**Beta Zeta**	November 6, 1931	Paris Junior College	Paris, Texas	Texas	Active	
**Beta Eta**	February 11, 1932	Amarillo College	Amarillo, Texas	Texas	Active	
**Beta Iota**	February 8, 1932	Grays Harbor College	Aberdeen, Washington	Washington	Active	
**Beta Nu**	May 17, 1932	San Antonio College	San Antonio, Texas	Texas	Active	
**Beta Omega**	May 29, 1935	Independence Community College	Independence, Kansas	Kansas	Active	
**Beta Theta Sigma**	November 4, 1999	Fashion Institute of Technology	New York, New York	New York	Active	
**Gamma Lambda**	May 15, 1936	Hinds Community College	Raymond, Mississippi	Mississippi	Active	
**Gamma Nu**	January 15, 1937	Mississippi Gulf Coast Community College	Perkinston, Mississippi	Mississippi	Active	
**Gamma Xi**	March 26, 1938	Trinidad State College	Trinidad, Colorado	Colorado	Active	
**Gamma Omicron**	January 1, 1937	Kilgore College	Kilgore, Texas	Texas	Active	
**Gamma Sigma**	June 10, 1937	Del Mar College	Corpus Christi, Texas	Texas	Active	
**Gamma Tau**	March 15, 1938	Lower Columbia College	Longview, Washington	Washington	Active	
**Gamma Upsilon**	December 2, 1938	Louisburg College	Louisburg, North Carolina	North Carolina	Active	
**Delta Epsilon**	April 19, 1940	Valley Forge Military College	Wayne, Pennsylvania	Pennsylvania	Active	
**Delta Iota**	March 1, 1941	Spartanburg Methodist College	Spartanburg, South Carolina	South Carolina	Active	
**Delta Kappa**	January 9, 1943	North Idaho College	Coeur d'Alene, Idaho	Idaho	Active	
**Delta Omicron**	April 22, 1943	Palm Beach State College, Lake Worth Campus	Lake Worth, Florida	Florida	Active	
**Delta Rho**	April 1, 1943	Otero College	La Junta, Colorado	Colorado	Active	
**Delta Tau**	January 5, 1945	Ranger College	Ranger, Texas	Texas	Active	
**Zeta Alpha**	April 1, 1946	Casper College	Casper, Wyoming	Wyoming	Active	
**Zeta Gamma**	April 14, 1947	Victoria College	Victoria, Texas	Texas	Active	
**Zeta Zeta**	May 13, 1947	Mississippi Delta Community College, Moorhead Campus	Moorhead, Mississippi	Mississippi	Active	
**Zeta Eta**	May 27, 1947	Riverland Community College, Austin Campus	Austin, Minnesota	Minnesota	Active	
**Zeta Theta**	April 30, 1947	Northeastern Junior College	Sterling, Colorado	Colorado	Active	
**Zeta Iota**	November 1, 1947	Minnesota North College – Mesabi Range Virginia	Virginia, Minnesota	Minnesota	Active	
**Zeta Nu**	December 10, 1947	Lee College	Baytown, Texas	Texas	Active	
**Zeta Xi**	December 10, 1947	Wharton County Junior College	Wharton, Texas	Texas	Active	
**Zeta Omicron**	April 2, 1948	Navarro College	Corsicana, Texas	Texas	Active	
**Zeta Sigma**	May 12, 1948	Texarkana College	Texarkana, Texas	Texas	Active	
**Zeta Psi**	June 3, 1949	Vincennes University	Vincennes, Indiana	Indiana	Active	
**Eta Alpha**	October 6, 1949	Southeast Community College, Beatrice Campus	Beatrice, Nebraska	Nebraska	Active	
**Eta Beta**	October 14, 1949	Southwest Texas Junior College, Uvalde Campus	Uvalde, Texas	Texas	Active	
**Eta Gamma**	October 28, 1949	Coffeyville Community College	Coffeyville, Kansas	Kansas	Active	
**Eta Upsilon**	May 15, 1950	East Mississippi Community College	Scooba, Mississippi	Mississippi	Active	
**Eta Iota**	March 30, 1950	Frank Phillips College	Borger, Texas	Texas	Active	
**Eta Kappa**	March 11, 1950	Black Hawk College, Quad Cities Campus	Moline, Illinois	Illinois	Active	
**Eta Mu**	March 11, 1950	North Central Missouri College	Trenton, Missouri	Missouri	Active	
**Eta Nu**	March 30, 1950	St. Petersburg College, Gibbs Campus	St. Petersburg, Florida	Florida	Active	
**Eta Omicron**	April 24, 1950	Mid-Plains Community College, McCook Campus	McCook, Nebraska	Nebraska	Active	
**Eta Rho**	May 8, 1950	Wenatchee Valley College	Wenatchee, Washington	Washington	Active	
**Eta Tau**	May 8, 1950	Odessa College	Odessa, Texas	Texas	Active	
**Eta Psi**	April 6, 1951	Lewis and Clark Community College	Godfrey, Illinois	Illinois	Active	
**Eta Omega**	May 10, 1951	Copiah–Lincoln Community College	Wesson, Mississippi	Mississippi	Active	
**Theta Alpha**	June 2, 1951	Baltimore City Community College	Baltimore, Maryland	Maryland	Active	
**Theta Beta**	November 23, 1951	Fresno City College	Fresno, California	California	Active	
**Theta Epsilon**	January 26, 1952	Southwestern Illinois College, Belleville Campus	Belleville, Illinois	Illinois	Active	
**Theta Iota**	March 31, 1952	Snead State Community College	Boaz, Alabama	Alabama	Active	
**Theta Theta**	March 24, 1952	Laredo College	Laredo, Texas	Texas	Active	
**Theta Lambda**	April 23, 1953	Andrew College	Cuthbert, Georgia	Georgia	Active	
**Theta Xi**	May 20, 1954	East Central Community College	Decatur, Mississippi	Mississippi	Active	
**Theta Omicron**	July 9, 1954	Morton College	Cicero, Illinois	Illinois	Active	
**Theta Pi**	April 16, 1955	Eastern Oklahoma State College	Wilburton, Oklahoma	Oklahoma	Active	
**Theta Sigma**	January 4, 1956	Northwest Mississippi Community College	Senatobia, Mississippi	Mississippi	Active	
**Theta Upsilon**	April 13, 1956	Skagit Valley College	Mount Vernon, Washington	Washington	Active	
**Theta Chi**	April 13, 1956	Pensacola State College	Pensacola, Florida	Florida	Active	
**Theta Omega**	September 3, 1956	Wilbur Wright College	Chicago, Illinois	Illinois	Active	
**Iota Alpha**	November 23, 1956	Trinity Valley Community College	Athens, Texas	Texas	Active	
**Iota Beta**	April 20, 1957	Howard College	Big Spring, Texas	Texas	Active	
**Iota Zeta**	April 20, 1957	Northeast Mississippi Community College	Booneville, Mississippi	Mississippi	Active	
**Iota Eta**	April 20, 1957	West Kentucky Community and Technical College	Booneville, Mississippi	Kentucky	Active	
**Iota Theta**	April 20, 1957	Sheridan College	Sheridan, Wyoming	Wyoming	Active	
**Iota Iota**	April 20, 1957	Southern Union State Community College	Wadley, Alabama	Alabama	Active	
**Iota Kappa**	May 18, 1957	Harcum College	Bryn Mawr, Pennsylvania	Pennsylvania	Active	
**Iota Mu**	May 18, 1957	Pearl River Community College	Poplarville, Mississippi	Mississippi	Active	
**Iota Xi**	March 10, 1958	Union College, Cranford Campus	Cranford, New Jersey	New Jersey	Active	
**Iota Omicron**	January 15, 1958	Kaskaskia College	Centralia, Illinois	Illinois	Active	
**Iota Phi**	March 25, 1958	Clarendon College	Clarendon, Texas	Texas	Active	
**Iota Omega**	January 19, 1959	Centralia College	Centralia, Washington	Washington	Active	
**Kappa Alpha**	December 17, 1958	Holmes Community College	Goodman, Mississippi	Mississippi	Active	
**Kappa Beta**	February 2, 1959	Kendall College	Chicago, Illinois	Illinois	Active	
**Kappa Gamma**	February 2, 1959	Hutchinson Community College	Hutchinson, Kansas	Kansas	Active	
**Kappa Eta**	April 22, 1959	Gulf Coast State College	Panama City, Florida	Florida	Active	
**Kappa Kappa**	November 4, 1959	Everett Community College	Everett, Washington	Washington	Active	
**Kappa Mu**	January 12, 1960	South Plains College	Levelland, Texas	Texas	Active	
**Kappa Nu**	February 18, 1960	College of Central Florida, Ocala Campus	Ocala, Florida	Florida	Active	
**Kappa Omicron**	February 18, 1960	Bismarck State College	Bismarck, North Dakota	North Dakota	Active	
**Kappa Sigma**	March 18, 1960	South Georgia State College, Douglas Campus	Douglas, Georgia	Georgia	Active	
**Kappa Tau**	March 18, 1960	Metropolitan Community College, Longview Campus	Lees Summit, Missouri	Missouri	Active	
**Kappa Psi**	April 21, 1960	Dodge City Community College	Dodge City, Kansas	Kansas	Active	
**Kappa Omega**	April 21, 1960	Montgomery College, Takoma Park Campus	Takoma Park, Maryland	Maryland	Active	
**Lambda Beta**	April 21, 1960	Mohawk Valley Community College, Utica Campus	Utica, New York	New York	Active	
**Lambda Gamma**	April 21, 1960	State University of New York at Cobleskill	Cobleskill, New York	New York	Active	
**Lambda Delta**	May 25, 1960	Bacone College	Muskogee, Oklahoma	Oklahoma	Active	
**Lambda Epsilon**	May 26, 1960	Bevill State Community College, Jasper Campus	Jasper, Alabama	Alabama	Active	
**Lambda Theta**	November 17, 1960	Temple College	Temple, Texas	Texas	Active	
**Lambda Iota**	January 3, 1961	Olive–Harvey College	Chicago, Illinois	Illinois	Active	
**Lambda Kappa**	April 27, 1961	Iowa Central Community College	Fort Dodge, Iowa	Iowa	Active	
**Lambda Mu**	April 27, 1961	St. Clair County Community College	Port Huron, Michigan	Michigan	Active	
**Lambda Nu**	April 27, 1961	Bronx Community College	The Bronx, New York City, New York	New York	Active	
**Lambda Xi**	May 5, 1961	State University of New York at Morrisville	Morrisville, New York	New York	Active	
**Lambda Omicron**	September 15, 1961	Eastern Arizona College	Thatcher, Arizona	Arizona	Active	
**Lambda Pi**	December 28, 1961	Western Nebraska Community College	Scottsbluff, Nebraska	Nebraska	Active	
**Lambda Rho**	January 22, 1962	Kennedy–King College	Chicago, Illinois	Illinois	Active	
**Lambda Sigma**	February 16, 1962	Queensborough Community College	Bayside, Queens, New York City, New York	New York	Active	
**Mu Delta**	May 15, 1962	Kansas City Kansas Community College	Kansas City, Kansas	Kansas	Active	
**Mu Epsilon**	May 15, 1962	Miami Dade College, North Campus	Miami, Florida	Florida	Active	
**Mu Eta**	May 15, 1962	SUNY Broome Community College, Binghamton Campus	Binghamton, New York	New York	Active	
**Mu Mu**	November 26, 1962	Broward College, A. Hugh Adams Central Campus	Davie, Florida	Florida	Active	
**Mu Nu**	January 21, 1963	Lake Michigan College	Benton Harbor, Michigan	Michigan	Active	
**Mu Xi**	March 30, 1963	North Florida College	Madison, Florida	Florida	Active	
**Mu Omicron**	January 21, 1963	San Jacinto College, Central Campus	Pasadena, Texas	Texas	Active	
**Mu Pi**	April 18, 1963	Harold Washington College	Chicago, Illinois	Illinois	Active	
**Mu Rho**	April 3, 1963	Daytona State College	Daytona Beach, Florida	Florida	Active	
**Mu Tau**	April 3, 1963	Lansing Community College	Lansing, Michigan	Michigan	Active	
**Mu Upsilon**	April 3, 1963	Alvin Community College	Alvin, Texas	Texas	Active	
**Mu Chi**	April 3, 1963	Connors State College, Warner Campus	Warner, Oklahoma	Oklahoma	Active	
**Mu Psi**	April 3, 1963	Southeastern Illinois College	Harrisburg, Illinois	Illinois	Active	
**Mu Omega**	August 25, 1963	Farmingdale State College	East Farmingdale, New York	New York	Active	
**Nu Delta**	December 8, 1964	Spoon River College	Canton, Illinois	Illinois	Active	
**Nu Zeta**	March 25, 1964	State College of Florida Bradenton	Bradenton, Florida	Florida	Active	
**Nu Iota**	April 22, 1964	Indian River State College	Fort Pierce, Florida	Florida	Active	
**Nu Lambda**	April 22, 1964	Truman College	Chicago, Illinois	Illinois	Active	
**Nu Mu**	April 22, 1964	Highland Community College	Freeport, Illinois	Illinois	Active	
**Nu Nu**	April 22, 1964	College of the Albemarle	Elizabeth City, North Carolina	North Carolina	Active	
**Nu Xi**	November 17, 1964	Hill College	Hillsboro, Texas	Texas	Active	
**Nu Omicron**	June 2, 1964	Alpena Community College	Alpena, Michigan	Michigan	Active	
**Nu Pi**	June 2, 1964	Sinclair Community College	Dayton, Ohio	Ohio	Active	
**Nu Sigma**	January 12, 1965	Prairie State College	Chicago Heights, Illinois	Illinois	Active	
**Nu Tau**	January 12, 1965	Mitchell Community College	Statesville, North Carolina	North Carolina	Active	
**Nu Upsilon**	January 12, 1965	Meridian Community College	Meridian, Mississippi	Mississippi	Active	
**Nu Chi**	March 1, 1965	Chipola College	Marianna, Florida	Florida	Active	
**Xi Alpha**	May 11, 1965	Berkshire Community College	Pittsfield, Massachusetts	Massachusetts	Active	
**Xi Delta**	March 29, 1965	Delta College	University Center, Michigan	Michigan	Active	
**Xi Epsilon**	April 11, 1965	St. Louis Community College–Forest Park	St. Louis, Missouri	Missouri	Active	
**Xi Zeta**	March 2, 1965	Jefferson College	Hillsboro, Missouri	Missouri	Active	
**Xi Theta**	April 27, 1965	Northern Oklahoma College	Tonkawa, Oklahoma	Oklahoma	Active	
**Xi Kappa**	May 11, 1965	Kingsborough Community College	Brooklyn, New York	New York	Active	
**Xi Lambda**	May 20, 1965	St. Louis Community College–Meramec	Kirkwood, Missouri	Missouri	Active	
**Xi Xi**	November 9, 1965	Crowder College	Neosho, Missouri	Missouri	Active	
**Xi Pi**	April 29, 1966	Polk State College	Winter Haven, Florida	Florida	Active	
**Xi Sigma**	February 11, 1966	Southeast Kentucky Community and Technical College	Cumberland, Kentucky	Kentucky	Active	
**Xi Phi**	December 9, 1966	Florida Gateway College	Lake City, Florida	Florida	Active	
**Xi Chi**	February 28, 1966	Manor College	Jenkintown, Pennsylvania	Pennsylvania	Active	
**Omicron Alpha**	April 15, 1966	Mississippi Gulf Coast Community College, Harrison County Campus	Gulfport, Mississippi	Mississippi	Active	
**Omicron Beta**	April 15, 1966	Mesa Community College, Southern and Dobson Campus	Mesa, Arizona	Arizona	Active	
**Omicron Gamma**	April 15, 1966	Cayuga Community College	Auburn, New York	New York	Active	
**Omicron Delta**	April 15, 1966	Southwest Mississippi Community College	Summit, Mississippi	Mississippi	Active	
**Omicron Epsilon**	April 28, 1966	Florida SouthWestern State College, Lee Campus	Fort Myers, Florida	Florida	Active	
**Omicron Zeta**	April 29, 1966	Somerset Community College	Somerset, Kentucky	Kentucky	Active	
**Omicron Eta**	April 28, 1966	Rock Valley College	Rockford, Illinois	Illinois	Active	
**Omicron Theta**	March 19, 1967	Anne Arundel Community College, Arnold Campus	Arnold, Maryland	Maryland	Active	
**Omicron Iota**	June 7, 1966	Schoolcraft College	Livonia, Michigan.	Michigan	Active	
**Omicron Kappa**	October 11, 1966	Marion Military Institute	Marion, Alabama	Alabama	Active	
**Omicron Lambda**	September 19, 1966	Glendale Community College	Glendale, Arizona	Arizona	Active	
**Omicron Mu**	November 9, 1966	Southeastern Community College	Whiteville, North Carolina	North Carolina	Active	
**Omicron Xi**	September 26, 1966	College of Southern Idaho	Twin Falls, Idaho	Idaho	Active	
**Omicron Omicron**	June 1, 1966	Minnesota State Community and Technical College, Fergus Falls Campus	Fergus Falls, Minnesota	Minnesota	Active	
**Omicron Pi**	October 8, 1966	Allegany College of Maryland	Cumberland, Maryland	Maryland	Active	
**Omicron Rho**	February 23, 1967	Lenoir Community College	Kinston, North Carolina	North Carolina	Active	
**Omicron Sigma**	November 5, 1966	Nassau Community College	East Garden City, New York	New York	Active	
**Omicron Tau**	January 21, 1967	Miami Dade College, Kendall Campus	Miami, Florida	Florida	Active	
**Omicron Upsilon**	November 25, 1966	Central Alabama Community College	Alexander City, Alabama	Alabama	Active	
**Omicron Phi**	November 25, 1966	Treasure Valley Community College	Ontario, Oregon	Oregon	Active	
**Omicron Psi**	February 6, 1966	Grayson College	Denison, Texas	Texas	Active	
**Pi Beta**	December 15, 1966	Panola College	Carthage, Texas	Texas	Active	
**Pi Gamma**	February 22, 1967	Florida College	Temple Terrace, Florida	Florida	Active	
**Pi Epsilon**	February 8, 1967	Mississippi Gulf Coast Community College, Jackson County Campus	Gautier, Mississippi	Mississippi	Active	
**Pi Eta**	February 17, 1967	Gordon State College, Barnesville Campus	Barnesville, Georgia	Georgia	Active	
**Pi Theta**	September 4, 1968	Hagerstown Community College	Hagerstown, Maryland	Maryland	Active	
**Pi Iota**	February 8, 1967	Shoreline Community College, Seattle Campus	Shoreline, Washington	Washington	Active	
**Pi Kappa**	April 30, 1967	St. Louis Community College–Florissant Valley	Ferguson, Missouri	Missouri	Active	
**Pi Lambda**	June 13, 1967	Seminole State College of Florida	Sanford, Florida	Florida	Active	
**Pi Omicron**	April 4, 1967	Community College of Rhode Island, Knight Campus	Warwick, Rhode Island	Rhode Island	Active	
**Pi Pi**	May 5, 1967	Jefferson State Community College, Jefferson Campus	Birmingham, Alabama	Alabama	Active	
**Pi Rho**	April 17, 1967	Richard J. Daley College	Chicago, Illinois	Illinois	Active	
**Pi Sigma**	April 8, 1967	Highline College	Des Moines, Washington	Washington	Active	
**Pi Xi**	March 23, 1967	Bucks County Community College, Newtown Campus	Newtown, Pennsylvania	Pennsylvania	Active	
**Pi Phi**	May 31, 1967	Clatsop Community College, Astoria Campus	Astoria, Oregon	Oregon	Active	
**Pi Chi**	May 1, 1967	McLennan Community College	Waco, Texas	Texas	Active	
**Pi Psi**	May 1, 1967	Coastal Alabama Community College, Bay Minette Campus	Bay Minette, Alabama	Alabama	Active	
**Pi Omega**	June 21, 1967	Danville Area Community College	Danville, Illinois	Illinois	Active	
**Rho Beta**	June 10, 1967	Harford Community College	Bel Air, Maryland	Maryland	Active	
**Rho Gamma**	June 30, 1967	Rowan College of South Jersey, Cumberland Branch Campus	Vineland, New Jersey	New Jersey	Active	
**Rho Epsilon**	September 5, 1967	The College of the Florida Keys	Key West, Florida	Florida	Active	
**Rho Zeta**	November 17, 1967	Big Bend Community College	Moses Lake, Washington	Washington	Active	
**Rho Eta**	February 11, 1972	Lake–Sumter State College, Leesburg Campus	Leesburg, Florida	Florida	Active	
**Rho Theta**	November 18, 1967	Mt. Hood Community College	Gresham, Oregon	Oregon	Active	
**Rho Iota**	December 17, 1967	Colby Community College	Colby, Kansas	Kansas	Active	
**Rho Kappa**	January 7, 1968	Elgin Community College	Elgin, Illinois	Illinois	Active	
**Rho Lambda**	March 22, 1968	Coastal Bend College	Alice, Texas	Texas	Active	
**Rho Mu**	November 18, 1967	University of North Georgia, Gainesville Campus	Oakwood, Georgia	Georgia	Active	
**Rho Xi**	April 10, 1968	Rend Lake College	Ina, Illinois	Illinois	Active	
**Rho Pi**	February 6, 1968	Phoenix College, Evening Division	Encanto, Phoenix, Arizonza	Arizona	Active	
**Rho Rho**	January 2, 1968	Gadsden State Community College	Gadsden, Alabama	Alabama	Active	
**Rho Sigma**	February 21, 1968	Jones College	Ellisville, Mississippi	Mississippi	Active	
**Rho Tau**	January 27, 1968	Tallahassee State College	Tallahassee, Florida	Florida	Active	
**Rho Upsilon**	May 4, 1968	Community College of Philadelphia	Philadelphia, Pennsylvania	Pennsylvania	Active	
**Rho Phi**	April 3, 1968	Butler County Community College, Butler Campus	Butler Township, Pennsylvania	Pennsylvania	Active	
**Rho Chi**	April 5, 1968	Tarrant County College, South Campus	Fort Worth, Texas	Texas	Active	
**Rho Psi**	April 3, 1968	Wabash Valley College	Mount Carmel, Illinois	Illinois	Active	
**Rho Omega**	March 1, 1968	Illinois Valley Community College	Oglesby, Illinois	Illinois	Active	
**Sigma Alpha**	March 4, 1968	Northland Community & Technical College, Thief River Falls Campus	Thief River Falls, Minnesota	Minnesota	Active	
**Sigma Beta**	March 1, 1968	Arizona Western College	Yuma, Arizona	Arizona	Active	
**Sigma Gamma**	March 24, 1968	Galveston College	Galveston, Texas	Texas	Active	
**Sigma Zeta**	May 2, 1968	Lane Community College	Eugene, Oregon	Oregon	Active	
**Sigma Theta**	June 4, 1968	Milwaukee Area Technical College, Downtown Campus	Milwaukee, Wisconsin	Wisconsin	Active	
**Sigma Iota**	May 6, 1968	Central Texas College	Killeen, Texas	Texas	Active	
**Sigma Kappa**	May 3, 1968	Phillips Community College of the University of Arkansas	Helena–West Helena, Arkansas	Arkansas	Active	
**Sigma Lambda**	May 19, 1968	Calhoun Community College, Decatur Campus	Huntsville, Alabama	Alabama	Active	
**Sigma Mu**	April 23, 1968	Northwest Florida State College	Niceville, Florida	Florida	Active	
**Sigma Xi**	May 4, 1968	Western Wyoming Community College	Rock Springs, Wyoming	Wyoming	Active	
**Sigma Omicron**	April 30, 1968	Community College of Allegheny County, Boyce Campus	Monroeville, Pennsylvania	Pennsylvania	Active	
**Sigma Rho**	May 20, 1968	Three Rivers College	Poplar Bluff, Missouri	Missouri	Active	
**Sigma Tau**	May 22, 1968	Dallas College, El Centro Campus	Downtown Dallas, Texas	Texas	Active	
**Sigma Phi**	May 6, 1968	Arapahoe Community College	Littleton, Colorado	Colorado	Active	
**Sigma Chi**	August 9, 1968	Isothermal Community College	Spindale, North Carolina	North Carolina	Active	
**Sigma Psi**	May 5, 1969	Southwestern Michigan College	Dowagiac, Michigan	Michigan	Active	
**Sigma Omega**	September 29, 1968	West Virginia University at Parkersburg	Parkersburg, West Virginia	West Virginia	Active	
**Tau Beta**	September 14, 1968	Davidson-Davie Community College, Davidson Campus	Thomasville, North Carolina	North Carolina	Active	
**Tau Gamma**	December 15, 1968	Northampton Community College	Bethlehem, Pennsylvania	Pennsylvania	Active	
**Tau Delta**	October 30, 1968	Generations College	Chicago, Illinois	Illinois	Active	
**Tau Epsilon**	December 6, 1968	South Florida State College, Highland Campus	Avon Park, Florida	Florida	Active	
**Tau Zeta**	October 25, 1968	St. Petersburg College, Clearwater Campus	Clearwater, Florida	Florida	Active	
**Tau Eta**	December 14, 1968	Allen Community College, Iola Campus	Iola, Kansas	Kansas	Active	
**Tau Theta**	February 12, 1969	Labette Community College	Parsons, Kansas	Kansas	Active	
**Tau Iota**	March 1, 1969	Ocean County College	Toms River, New Jersey	New Jersey	Active	
**Tau Lambda**	January 26, 1969	Villa Maria College	Cheektowaga, New York	New York	Active	
**Tau Mu**	March 17, 1969	Enterprise State Community College	Enterprise, Alabama	Alabama	Active	
**Tau Nu**	February 18, 1969	Northern Virginia Community College	Alexandria, Virginia	Virginia	Active	
**Tau Xi**	February 6, 1969	Jefferson Community College	Watertown, New York	New York	Active	
**Tau Omicron**	February 10, 1969	Monroe County Community College	Monroe Charter Township, Michigan	Michigan	Active	
**Tau Pi**	March 26, 1969	Prince George's Community College	Largo, Maryland	Maryland	Active	
**Tau Rho**	March 31, 1969	Brightpoint Community College	Chester, Virginia	Virginia	Active	
**Tau Phi**	April 30, 1969	Des Moines Area Community College, Boone Campus	Boone, Iowa	Iowa	Active	
**Tau Chi**	March 26, 1969	Northeast Community College, Norfolk Campus	Norfolk, Nebraska	Nebraska	Active	
**Upsilon Beta**	May 7, 1972	SUNY Adirondack	Queensbury, New York	New York	Active	
**Upsilon Gamma**	April 20, 1969	Middlesex College	Edison, New Jersey	New Jersey	Active	
**Upsilon Delta**	June 8, 1969	Southwest Tennessee Community College, Macon Cove Campus	Northeast Memphis, Tennessee	Tennessee	Active	
**Upsilon Epsilon**	May 15, 1969	Herkimer County Community College	Herkimer, New York	New York	Active	
**Upsilon Zeta**	May 12, 1969	Dean College	Franklin, Massachusetts	Massachusetts	Active	
**Upsilon Eta**	May 1, 1969	Florida State College at Jacksonville, Kent Campus	Jacksonville, Florida	Florida	Active	
**Upsilon Iota**	May 20, 1969	Dalton State College	Dalton, Georgia	Georgia	Active	
**Upsilon Kappa**	May 28, 1969	Metropolitan Community College, Penn Valley Campus	Kansas City, Missouri	Missouri	Active	
**Upsilon Mu**	November 23, 1969	Illinois Central College	East Peoria, Illinois	Illinois	Active	
**Upsilon Xi**	October 9, 1969	Metropolitan Community College, Maple Woods Campus	Kansas City, Missouri	Missouri	Active	
**Upsilon Pi**	November 6, 1969	John A. Logan College	Carterville, Illinois	Illinois	Active	
**Upsilon Rho**	November 10, 1969	Angelina College	Lufkin, Texas	Texas	Active	
**Upsilon Sigma**	December 16, 1969	Itawamba Community College	Fulton, Mississippi	Mississippi	Active	
**Upsilon Tau**	January 13, 1970	Cloud County Community College	Concordia, Kansas	Kansas	Active	
**Upsilon Upsilon**	January 22, 1970	Southwest Virginia Community College, Richlands Campus	Richlands, Virginia	Virginia	Active	
**Upsilon Phi**	January 24, 1970	Danville Community College	Danville, Virginia	Virginia	Active	
**Upsilon Chi**	January 26, 1970	Wayne Community College	Goldsboro, North Carolina	North Carolina	Active	
**Upsilon Psi**	April 13, 1970	University of Cincinnati Blue Ash College	Blue Ash, Ohio	Ohio	Active	
**Upsilon Omega**	February 2, 1970	Central Lakes College, Brainerd Campus	Brainerd, Minnesota	Minnesota	Active	
**Phi Alpha**	February 9, 1970	New Mexico Military Institute, Roswell Campus	Roswell, New Mexico	New Mexico	Active	
**Phi Beta**	March 5, 1970	College of DuPage	Glen Ellyn, Illinois	Illinois	Active	
**Phi Delta**	March 24, 1970	Mount Wachusett Community College	Gardner, Massachusetts	Massachusetts	Active	
**Phi Epsilon**	January 1, 1970	Northwest College	Powell, Wyoming	Wyoming	Active	
**Phi Zeta**	April 6, 1970	Pratt Community College	Pratt, Kansas	Kansas	Active	
**Phi Eta**	June 12, 1970	Virginia Western Community College	Roanoke, Virginia	Virginia	Active	
**Phi Kappa**	April 24, 1970	Henderson Community College	Henderson, Kentucky	Kentucky	Active	
**Phi Lambda**	March 18, 1970	Central Piedmont Community College, Central Campus	Charlotte, North Carolina	North Carolina	Active	
Phi Mu	May 4, 1970	University of Wisconsin–Platteville Richland	Richland Center, Wisconsin	Wisconsin	Inactive	(Note: The college's last semester ended in May 2023.)
**Phi Xi**	May 4, 1970	North Hennepin Community College	Brooklyn Park, Minnesota	Minnesota	Active	
**Phi Omicron**	May 6, 1970	Waubonsee Community College, Sugar Grove Campus	Sugar Grove, Illinois	Illinois	Active	
**Phi Pi**	May 26, 1970	Lorain County Community College	Elyria, Ohio	Ohio	Active	
**Phi Sigma**	May 20, 1970	Virginia Peninsula Community College, Hampton Campus	Hampton, Virginia	Virginia	Active	
**Phi Tau**	October 23, 1970	Tarrant County College, Northeast Campus	Hurst, Texas	Texas	Active	
**Phi Upsilon**	August 13, 1970	Coastal Alabama Community College, Monroeville Campus	Monroeville, Alabama	Alabama	Active	
**Phi Phi**	April 23, 1974	Harper College	Palatine, Illinois	Illinois	Active	
**Phi Chi**	September 20, 1970	Hillsborough Community College, Dale Mabry Campus	Tampa, Florida	Florida	Active	
**Phi Psi**	September 5, 1970	Barton Community College	Great Bend, Kansas	Kansas	Active	
**Chi Alpha**	October 25, 1970	Seward County Community College	Liberal, Kansas	Kansas	Active	
**Chi Gamma**	January 1, 1970	Tacoma Community College	Tacoma, Washington	Washington	Active	
**Chi Delta**	November 16, 1970	East Central College	Union, Missouri	Missouri	Active	
**Chi Epsilon**	November 23, 1970	Valencia College, West Campus	Orlando, Florida	Florida	Active	
**Chi Zeta**	December 11, 1970	Triton College, West Campus	River Grove, Illinois	Illinois	Active	
**Chi Eta**	December 17, 1970	Madisonville Community College	Madisonville, Kentucky	Kentucky	Active	
**Chi Theta**	January 6, 1971	Community College of Baltimore County, Essex Campus	Baltimore, Maryland	Maryland	Active	
**Chi Iota**	January 14, 1971	Rowan College at Burlington County	Mount Laurel, New Jersey	New Jersey	Active	
**Chi Kappa**	February 2, 1971	Carl Sandburg College	Galesburg, Illinois	Illinois	Active	
**Chi Mu**	February 11, 1971	Tidewater Community College, Portsmouth Campus	Portsmouth, Virginia	Virginia	Active	
**Chi Nu**	November 6, 1970	Eastern Florida State College, Melbourne Campus	Melbourne, Florida	Florida	Active	
**Chi Xi**	February 12, 1971	Albany State University, West Campus	Albany, Georgia	Georgia	Active	
**Chi Omicron**	February 21, 1971	Jackson State Community College	Jackson, Tennessee	Tennessee	Active	
**Chi Pi**	March 11, 1971	Perimeter College at Georgia State University	Clarkston, Georgia	Georgia	Active	
**Chi Rho**	April 14, 1971	Connecticut State Community College Housatonic	Bridgeport, Connecticut	Connecticut	Active	
**Chi Sigma**	May 2, 1971	Central Community College, Columbus Campus	Columbus, Nebraska	Nebraska	Active	
**Chi Tau**	April 16, 1971	St. Johns River State College, Palatka Campus	Palatka, Florida	Florida	Active	
**Chi Upsilon**	April 16, 1971	McHenry County College	Crystal Lake, Illinois	Illinois	Active	
**Chi Chi**	May 24, 1971	University of Wisconsin–Milwaukee at Washington County	West Bend, Wisconsin	Wisconsin	Active	
**Chi Psi**	May 25, 1971	Central Virginia Community College	Lynchburg, Virginia	Virginia	Active	
**Chi Omega**	June 25, 1971	Cuyahoga Community College, Western Campus	Parma, Ohio	Ohio	Active	
**Psi Gamma**	July 26, 1971	Scottsdale Community College	Scottsdale, Arizona	Arizona	Active	
**Psi Epsilon**	November 22, 1971	Northeast Alabama Community College	Rainsville, Alabama	Alabama	Active	
**Psi Zeta**	February 11, 1972	Western Texas College	Snyder, Texas	Texas	Active	
**Psi Eta**	January 17, 1972	Dallas College Eastfield	Mesquite, Texas	Texas	Active	
**Psi Theta**	February 6, 1972	New Mexico Junior College	Hobbs, New Mexico	New Mexico	Active	
**Psi Iota**	February 27, 1972	North Central Texas College	Gainesville, Texas	Texas	Active	
**Psi Kappa**	May 10, 1972	St. Philip's College	San Antonio, Texas	Texas	Active	
**Psi Omicron**	April 20, 1972	Nassau Community College	East Garden City, New York	New York	Active	
**Psi Pi**	May 1, 1972	South Suburban College	South Holland, Illinois	Illinois	Active	
**Psi Rho**	May 8, 1972	Colorado Mountain College, Roaring Fork Campus	Glenwood Springs, Colorado	Colorado	Active	
**Psi Sigma**	May 25, 1972	University of Hawaiʻi Maui College	Kahului, Hawaii	Hawaii	Active	
**Psi Upsilon**	July 30, 1972	Tidewater Community College, Virginia Beach Campus	Virginia Beach, Virginia	Virginia	Active	
**Psi Phi**	June 13, 1972	Patrick & Henry Community College	Martinsville, Virginia	Virginia	Active	
**Psi Psi**	December 14, 1972	Brazosport College	Lake Jackson, Texas	Texas	Active	
**Omega Alpha**	November 21, 1972	Tulsa Community College, Metro Campus	Tulsa, Oklahoma	Oklahoma	Active	
**Omega Beta**	November 13, 1972	Wallace Community College, Wallace Campus	Dothan, Alabama	Alabama	Active	
**Omega Gamma**	December 8, 1972	El Paso Community College	El Paso, Texas	Texas	Active	(Note: This chapter serves the Rio Grande Campus, the Transmountain Campus, and the Valle Verde Campus.)
**Omega Delta**	February 7, 1973	Abraham Baldwin Agricultural College	Tifton, Georgia	Georgia	Active	
**Omega Epsilon**	February 22, 1973	West Virginia Northern Community College	Wheeling, West Virginia	West Virginia	Active	
**Omega Zeta**	February 26, 1973	Paul D. Camp Community College	Franklin, Virginia	Virginia	Active	
**Omega Eta**	February 27, 1973	New River Community College	Dublin, Virginia	Virginia	Active	
**Omega Theta**	March 10, 1973	Pierce College Fort Steilacoom	Lakewood, Washington	Washington	Active	
**Omega Iota**	March 21, 1973	Neosho County Community College	Chanute, Kansas	Kansas	Active	
**Omega Kappa**	April 3, 1973	Vernon College	Vernon, Texas	Texas	Active	
**Omega Mu**	May 17, 1973	Bevill State Community College, Fayette Campus	Fayette, Alabama	Alabama	Active	
**Omega Nu**	May 11, 1973	Delgado Community College, City Park Campus	Navarre, New Orleans, Louisiana	Louisiana	Active	
**Omega Omicron**	June 1, 1973	Cleveland State Community College	Cleveland, Tennessee	Tennessee	Active	
**Omega Rho**	August 25, 1973	Post University	Waterbury, Connecticut	Connecticut	Active	
**Omega Sigma**	September 13, 1973	Houston Community College, Northwest College, Katy Campus	Houston, Texas	Texas	Active	
**Omega Phi**	December 31, 1973	Broward College, North Campus	Coconut Creek, Florida	Florida	Active	
**Omega Chi**	December 3, 1973	Piedmont Technical College	Greenwood, South Carolina	South Carolina	Active	
**Omega Omega**	March 15, 1974	Dallas College Mountain View	Dallas, Texas	Texas	Active	
**Alpha Alpha Alpha**	January 28, 1974	Zane State College	Zanesville, Ohio	Ohio	Active	
**Alpha Alpha Gamma**	February 28, 1974	Century College	White Bear Lake, Minnesota	Minnesota	Active	
**Alpha Alpha Delta**	March 14, 1974	Orangeburg–Calhoun Technical College	Orangeburg, South Carolina	South Carolina	Active	
**Alpha Alpha Epsilon**	April 1, 1974	GateWay Community College	Phoenix, Arizona	Arizona	Active	
**Alpha Alpha Zeta**	March 30, 1974	Copiah–Lincoln Community College, Natchez Campus	Natchez, Mississippi	Mississippi	Active	
**Alpha Alpha Theta**	April 29, 1974	Cecil College	North East, Maryland	Maryland	Active	
**Alpha Alpha Iota**	May 6, 1974	York Technical College	Rock Hill, South Carolina	South Carolina	Active	
**Alpha Alpha Lambda**	June 5, 1974	Edmonds College	Lynnwood, Washington	Washington	Active	
**Alpha Alpha Xi**	November 3, 1974	Dallas College Richland	Dallas, Texas	Texas	Active	
**Alpha Alpha Omicron**	October 18, 1974	Richland Community College	Decatur, Illinois	Illinois	Active	
**Alpha Alpha Pi**	October 21, 1974	College of Lake County	Grayslake, Illinois	Illinois	Active	
**Alpha Alpha Rho**	November 27, 1974	Lone Star College–North Harris	Houston, Texas	Texas	Active	
**Alpha Alpha Sigma**	December 9, 1974	Howard Community College	Columbia, Maryland	Maryland	Active	
**Alpha Alpha Upsilon**	January 13, 1975	Fulton–Montgomery Community College	Johnstown, New York	New York	Active	
**Alpha Alpha Psi**	February 22, 1975	University of Akron	Akron, Ohio	Ohio	Active	
**Alpha Alpha Omega**	February 27, 1975	San Jacinto College, North Campus	Houston, Texas	Texas	Active	
**Alpha Beta Alpha**	March 3, 1975	Jacksonville College	Jacksonville, Texas	Texas	Active	
**Alpha Beta Beta**	March 13, 1975	Hillsborough Community College, Ybor City Campus	Ybor City, Tampa, Florida	Florida	Active	
**Alpha Beta Gamma**	April 10, 1975	Perimeter College at Georgia State University, Decatur Campus	Decatur, Georgia	Georgia	Active	
**Alpha Beta Epsilon**	March 24, 1975	Hazard Community & Technical College	Hazard, Kentucky	Kentucky	Active	
**Alpha Beta Zeta**	April 27, 1975	Cochise College, Douglas Campus	Douglas, Arizona	Arizona	Active	
**Alpha Beta Eta**	April 23, 1975	Lurleen B. Wallace Community College, Andalusia Campus	Andalusia, Alabama	Alabama	Active	
**Alpha Beta Theta**	April 17, 1975	Mid-Plains Community College, North Platte South Campus	North Platte, Nebraska	Nebraska	Active	
**Alpha Beta Iota**	May 7, 1975	Walters State Community College	Morristown, Tennessee	Tennessee	Active	
**Alpha Beta Kappa**	June 11, 1975	Delaware Technical Community College, Charles L. Terry, Jr. Campus	Dover, Delaware	Delaware	Active	
**Alpha Beta Mu**	March 11, 1976	Chattanooga State Community College	Chattanooga, Tennessee	Tennessee	Active	
**Alpha Beta Xi**	November 25, 1975	Hinds Community College, Utica Campus	Utica, Mississippi	Mississippi	Active	
**Alpha Beta Omicron**	December 8, 1975	Richard Bland College, Petersburg Campus	Prince George, Virginia	Virginia	Active	
**Alpha Beta Rho**	February 26, 1976	Northern Virginia Community College, Annandale	Annandale, Virginia	Virginia	Active	
**Alpha Beta Upsilon**	April 15, 1976	Redlands Community College	El Reno, Oklahoma	Oklahoma	Active	
**Alpha Beta Phi**	April 15, 1976	Midland College	Midland, Texas	Texas	Active	
**Alpha Beta Chi**	January 1, 1976	Pima Community College, District Office	Tucson, Arizona	Arizona	Active	
**Alpha Beta Psi**	January 1, 1976	National Park College, Hot Springs Campus	Hot Springs, Arkansas	Arkansas	Active	
**Alpha Beta Omega**	May 7, 1976	Laurel Ridge Community College, Middletown Campus	Middletown, Virginia	Virginia	Active	
**Alpha Gamma Alpha**	June 17, 1976	Pikes Peak State College, Centennial Campus	Colorado Springs, Colorado	Colorado	Active	
**Alpha Gamma Gamma**	March 13, 1977	Cisco College	Cisco, Texas	Texas	Active	
**Alpha Gamma Delta**	January 24, 1977	Miami Dade College, Medical Campus	Miami, Florida	Florida	Active	
**Alpha Gamma Epsilon**	March 18, 1977	Abraham Baldwin Agricultural College, Bainbridge Campus	Bainbridge, Georgia	Georgia	Active	(Note: Chapter formed at Bainbridge State College, which merged into Abraham Baldwin Agricultural College in 2017.)
**Alpha Gamma Zeta**	March 7, 1977	San Jacinto College, South Campus	Houston, Texas	Texas	Active	
**Alpha Gamma Theta**	April 12, 1977	Hillsborough Community College, Plant City Campus	Plant City, Florida	Florida	Active	
**Alpha Gamma Iota**	May 1, 1977	South Arkansas College	El Dorado, Arkansas	Arkansas	Active	
**Alpha Gamma Kappa**	April 4, 1977	Miami Dade College, Wolfson Campus	Miami, Florida	Florida	Active	
**Alpha Gamma Mu**	July 21, 1977	Western Piedmont Community College	Morganton, North Carolina	North Carolina	Active	
**Alpha Gamma Nu**	January 10, 1978	Tompkins Cortland Community College	Dryden, New York	New York	Active	
**Alpha Gamma Omega**	January 10, 1978	Valencia College, East Campus	Orlando, Florida	Florida	Active	
**Alpha Gamma Omicron**	October 11, 1977	J. Sargeant Reynolds Community College, Downtown Campus	Richmond, Virginia	Virginia	Active	
**Alpha Gamma Pi**	October 1, 1977	Austin Community College, Rio Grande Campus	Austin, Texas	Texas	Active	
**Alpha Gamma Rho**	September 15, 1977	Virginia Highlands Community College	Abingdon, Virginia	Virginia	Active	
**Alpha Gamma Sigma**	September 27, 1977	Palm Beach State College, Palm Beach Gardens Campus	Palm Beach Gardens, Florida	Florida	Active	
**Alpha Gamma Tau**	January 27, 1978	Northland Pioneer College, Painted Desert Campus	Winslow, Arizona	Arizona	Active	
**Alpha Gamma Upsilon**	December 8, 1977	Cowley Community College	Arkansas City, Kansas	Kansas	Active	
**Alpha Gamma Chi**	January 1, 1977	Northwest Mississippi Community College, Desoto Center	Southaven, Mississippi	Mississippi	Active	
**Alpha Delta Alpha**	April 20, 1978	Anoka-Ramsey Community College, Coon Rapids Campus	Coon Rapids, Minnesota	Minnesota	Active	
**Alpha Delta Beta**	May 24, 1978	Wytheville Community College	Wytheville, Virginia	Virginia	Active	
**Alpha Delta Gamma**	April 20, 1978	Suffolk County Community College, Michael J. Grant Campus	Brentwood, New York	New York	Active	
**Alpha Delta Delta**	April 27, 1978	Tarrant County College, Northwest Campus	Fort Worth, Texas	Texas	Active	
**Alpha Delta Epsilon**	May 31, 1978	Pasco–Hernando State College, North Campus	Brooksville, Florida	Florida	Active	
**Alpha Delta Eta**	December 19, 1978	Kankakee Community College	Kankakee, Illinois	Illinois	Active	
**Alpha Delta Theta**	December 15, 1978	Jefferson Community and Technical College, Downtown Campus	Louisville, Kentucky	Kentucky	Active	
**Alpha Delta Iota**	October 22, 1978	Palm Beach State College, Boca Raton Campus	Boca Raton, Florida	Florida	Active	
**Alpha Delta Lambda**	November 3, 1978	Carl Albert State College	Poteau, Oklahoma	Oklahoma	Active	
**Alpha Delta Mu**	January 19, 1979	Atlantic Cape Community College, Mays Landing Campus	Mays Landing, New Jersey	New Jersey	Active	
**Alpha Delta Nu**	November 16, 1978	Palm Beach State College, Belle Glade Campus	Belle Glade, Florida	Florida	Active	
**Alpha Delta Omicron**	April 25, 1979	Middlesex Community College, Bedford Campus	Bedford, Massachusetts	Massachusetts	Active	
**Alpha Delta Pi**	February 26, 1979	Dallas College Brookhaven	Farmers Branch, Texas	Texas	Active	
**Alpha Delta Rho**	February 7, 1979	Broward College, Judson A. Samuels South Campus	Pembroke Pines, Florida	Florida	Active	
**Alpha Delta Sigma**	March 1, 1979	Frederick Community College	Frederick, Maryland	Maryland	Active	
**Alpha Delta Tau**	February 7, 1979	Northern Virginia Community College, Woodbridge Campus	Prince William County, Virginia	Virginia	Active	
**Alpha Delta Upsilon**	February 25, 1979	Anoka-Ramsey Community College, Cambridge Campus	Cambridge, Minnesota	Minnesota	Active	
**Alpha Delta Phi**	February 5, 1979	SUNY Erie, South Campus	Orchard Park, New York	New York	Active	
**Alpha Delta Chi**	March 1, 1979	River Valley Community College, Claremont Campus	Claremont, New Hampshire	New Hampshire	Active	
**Alpha Delta Psi**	April 6, 1979	Mountain Empire Community College	Big Stone Gap, Virginia	Virginia	Active	
**Alpha Delta Omega**	April 6, 1979	Glen Oaks Community College	Centreville, Michigan	Michigan	Active	
**Alpha Epsilon Alpha**	March 14, 1979	Dyersburg State Community College	Dyersburg, Tennessee	Tennessee	Active	
**Alpha Epsilon Gamma**	April 20, 1979	Lawson State Community College, Birmingham Campus	Birmingham, Alabama	Alabama	Active	
**Alpha Epsilon Delta**	November 29, 1979	SUNY Sullivan	Loch Sheldrake, New York	New York	Active	
**Alpha Epsilon Epsilon**	April 12, 1979	Delaware Technical Community College, Owens Campus	Georgetown, Delaware	Delaware	Active	
**Alpha Epsilon Zeta**	April 26, 1979	Delaware Technical Community College, Stanton Campus	Newark, Delaware	Delaware	Active	
**Alpha Epsilon Eta**	May 24, 1979	Cuyahoga Community College, Eastern Campus	Highland Hills, Ohio	Ohio	Active	
**Alpha Epsilon Iota**	May 11, 1979	Shelton State Community College, Martin Campus	Taylorville, Alabama	Alabama	Active	
**Alpha Epsilon Kappa**	May 11, 1979	Lincoln Land Community College	Springfield, Illinois	Illinois	Active	
**Alpha Epsilon Lambda**	October 22, 1979	St. Johns River State College, Orange Park Campus	Orange Park, Florida	Florida	Active	
**Alpha Epsilon Mu**	July 31, 1979	American Samoa Community College	Mapusaga, American Samoa	American Samoa	Active	
**Alpha Epsilon Nu**	August 1, 1979	Bishop State Community College	Mobile, Alabama	Alabama	Active	
**Alpha Epsilon Xi**	March 13, 1980	Columbia–Greene Community College	Hudson, New York	New York	Active	
**Alpha Epsilon Omicron**	August 22, 1979	Trident Technical College	North Charleston, South Carolina	South Carolina	Active	
**Alpha Epsilon Pi**	September 4, 1979	Raritan Valley Community College	Branchburg, New Jersey	New Jersey	Active	
**Alpha Epsilon Rho**	October 15, 1979	Bellevue College	Bellevue, Washington	Washington	Active	
**Alpha Epsilon Sigma**	October 15, 1979	Minneapolis Community and Technical College	Minneapolis, Minnesota	Minnesota	Active	
**Alpha Epsilon Tau**	November 30, 1979	Piedmont Virginia Community College	Charlottesville, Virginia	Virginia	Active	
**Alpha Epsilon Upsilon**	December 17, 1979	Pasco–Hernando State College, West Campus	New Port Richey, Florida	Florida	Active	
**Alpha Epsilon Phi**	December 15, 1979	Bergen Community College, Paramus Campus	Paramus, New Jersey	New Jersey	Active	
**Alpha Epsilon Chi**	April 15, 1981	Finger Lakes Community College	Canandaigua, New York	New York	Active	
**Alpha Epsilon Psi**	January 1, 1980	Denmark Technical College	Denmark, South Carolina	South Carolina	Active	
**Alpha Epsilon Omega**	February 8, 1980	North Seattle College	Seattle, Washington	Washington	Active	
**Alpha Zeta Beta**	October 1, 1980	Tri-County Technical College	Pendleton, South Carolina	South Carolina	Active	
**Alpha Zeta Gamma**	April 1, 1980	Highland Community College	Highland, Kansas	Kansas	Active	
**Alpha Zeta Delta**	May 28, 1980	Cuyahoga Community College, Metropolitan Campus	Cleveland, Ohio	Ohio	Active	
**Alpha Zeta Epsilon**	April 3, 1980	Pasco–Hernando State College, East Campus	Dade City, Florida	Florida	Active	
**Alpha Zeta Eta**	April 22, 1980	Dallas College North Lake	Irving, Texas	Texas	Active	
**Alpha Zeta Theta**	April 8, 1980	Quinsigamond Community College	Worcester, Massachusetts	Massachusetts	Active	
**Alpha Zeta Iota**	May 8, 1980	Northwest–Shoals Community College	Muscle Shoals, Alabama	Alabama	Active	
**Alpha Zeta Kappa**	June 1, 1980	Delaware Technical Community College, Orlando J. George Jr. Campus	Wilmington, Delaware	Delaware	Active	
**Alpha Zeta Lambda**	May 27, 1980	Tidewater Community College, Chesapeake Campus	Chesapeake, Virginia	Virginia	Active	
**Alpha Zeta Mu**	May 30, 1980	Perimeter College at Georgia State University, Dunwoody Campus	Dunwoody, Georgia	Georgia	Active	
**Alpha Zeta Nu**	June 2, 1980	Suffolk County Community College, Ammerman Campus	Selden, New York	New York	Active	
**Alpha Zeta Omicron**	December 31, 1980	Dallas College Cedar Valley	Lancaster, Texas	Texas	Active	
**Alpha Zeta Rho**	January 11, 1981	Northern Virginia Community College, Loudoun Campus	Sterling, Virginia	Virginia	Active	
**Alpha Zeta Sigma**	May 8, 1981	Greenville Technical College, Barton Campus	Greenville, South Carolina	South Carolina	Active	
**Alpha Zeta Tau**	January 28, 1981	St. Petersburg College, Tarpon Springs Campus	Tarpon Springs, Florida	Florida	Active	
**Alpha Zeta Upsilon**	February 20, 1981	Schenectady County Community College	Schenectady, New York	New York	Active	
**Alpha Zeta Phi**	April 10, 1981	Santa Fe College	Gainesville, Florida	Florida	Active	
**Alpha Zeta Chi**	June 1, 1981	Wayne College	Orrville, Ohio	Ohio	Active	
**Alpha Zeta Psi**	May 9, 1981	Connecticut State Community College Capital	Hartford, Connecticut	Connecticut	Active	
**Alpha Zeta Omega**	March 6, 1981	Hinds Community College, Academic/Technical Center	Jackson, Mississippi	Mississippi	Active	
**Alpha Eta Alpha**	April 13, 1981	Rose State College	Midwest City, Oklahoma	Oklahoma	Active	
**Alpha Eta Gamma**	March 1, 1986	Southern West Virginia Community and Technical College, Williamson Campus	Logan, West Virginia	West Virginia	Active	
**Alpha Eta Delta**	April 30, 1981	South Mountain Community College	Phoenix, Arizona	Arizona	Active	
**Alpha Eta Epsilon**	March 26, 1981	Hazard Community and Technical College, Lees College Campus	Jackson, Kentucky	Kentucky	Active	
**Alpha Eta Theta**	April 29, 1981	State University of New York at Delhi	Delhi, New York	New York	Active	
**Alpha Eta Iota**	June 12, 1981	Portland Community College, Sylvania Campus	Portland, Oregon	Oregon	Active	
**Alpha Eta Kappa**	June 22, 1981	Midlands Technical College, Airport Campus	Elgin, South Carolina	South Carolina	Active	
**Alpha Eta Lambda**	November 3, 1981	Coastal Alabama Community College Brewton Campus	Brewton, Alabama	Alabama	Active	
**Alpha Eta Xi**	January 15, 1982	Tri-County Community College	Murphy, North Carolina	North Carolina	Active	
**Alpha Eta Omicron**	January 1, 1982	Mountain Gateway Community College	Clifton Forge, Virginia	Virginia	Active	
**Alpha Eta Rho**	March 31, 1982	Kirkwood Community College	Cedar Rapids, Iowa	Iowa	Active	
**Alpha Eta Tau**	April 27, 1982	Wallace Community College Selma	Selma, Alabama	Alabama	Active	
**Alpha Eta Upsilon**	January 1, 1982	Mountwest Community and Technical College	Huntington, West Virginia	West Virginia	Active	
**Alpha Eta Phi**	January 1, 1982	Halifax Community College	Weldon, North Carolina	North Carolina	Active	
**Alpha Eta Chi**	January 1, 1982	Passaic County Community College	Paterson, New Jersey	New Jersey	Active	
**Alpha Eta Psi**	January 1, 1982	Suffolk County Community College, Eastern Campus	Riverhead, New York	New York	Active	
**Alpha Theta Alpha**	April 28, 1982	Oklahoma City Community College	Oklahoma City, Oklahoma	Oklahoma	Active	
**Alpha Theta Beta**	January 1, 1982	Clinton Community College	Clinton, Iowa	Iowa	Active	
**Alpha Theta Gamma**	May 1, 1982	Mercer County Community College, James Kerney Campus	West Windsor, New Jersey	New Jersey	Active	
**Alpha Theta Delta**	January 1, 1982	Central Arizona College, Signal Peak Campus	Coolidge, Arizona	Arizona	Active	
**Alpha Theta Epsilon**	November 19, 1982	Connecticut State Community College Naugatuck Valley	Waterbury, Connecticut	Connecticut	Active	
**Alpha Theta Zeta**	January 1, 1982	Central Ohio Technical College	Newark, Ohio	Ohio	Active	
**Alpha Theta Eta**	July 23, 1982	Olney Central College	Olney, Illinois	Illinois	Active	
**Alpha Theta Theta**	January 1, 1982	Essex County College, Newark Campus	Newark, New Jersey	New Jersey	Active	
**Alpha Theta Iota**	March 21, 1982	Monroe Community College, Brighton Campus	Brighton, New York	New York	Active	
**Alpha Theta Mu**	December 10, 1982	Western Oklahoma State College	Altus, Oklahoma	Oklahoma	Active	
**Alpha Theta Nu**	February 20, 1983	Seminole State College	Seminole, Oklahoma	Oklahoma	Active	
**Alpha Theta Xi**	January 1, 1983	Pellissippi State Community College, Division Street Campus	Knoxville, Tennessee	Tennessee	Active	
**Alpha Theta Omicron**	January 1, 1983	Rio Salado College	Tempe, Arizona	Arizona	Active	
**Alpha Theta Pi**	January 18, 1983	University of Wisconsin–Eau Claire – Barron County	Rice Lake, Wisconsin	Wisconsin	Active	
**Alpha Theta Rho**	November 20, 1983	Chattahoochee Valley Community College	Phenix City, Alabama	Alabama	Active	
**Alpha Theta Tau**	March 29, 1983	University of Wisconsin–Oshkosh, Fox Cities Campus	Menasha, Wisconsin	Wisconsin	Active	
**Alpha Theta Upsilon**	April 12, 1983	Southside Virginia Community College, Keysville Campus	Keysville, Virginia	Virginia	Active	
**Alpha Theta Phi**	January 1, 1983	LaGuardia Community College	Long Island City, New York City, New York	New York	Active	
**Alpha Theta Chi**	January 1, 1983	Southside Virginia Community College, Christanna Campus	Alberta, Virginia	Virginia	Active	
**Alpha Theta Psi**	May 5, 1983	Lake Land College	Mattoon, Illinois	Illinois	Active	
**Alpha Theta Omega**	April 29, 1983	Fort Scott Community College	Fort Scott, Kansas	Kansas	Active	
**Alpha Iota Alpha**	June 10, 1983	Connecticut State Community College Tunxis	Farmington, Connecticut	Connecticut	Active	
**Alpha Iota Beta**	May 11, 1983	J. Sargeant Reynolds Community College, Parham Road Campus	Richmond, Virginia	Virginia	Active	
**Alpha Iota Gamma**	May 11, 1983	Johnson County Community College	Overland Park, Kansas	Kansas	Active	
**Alpha Iota Epsilon**	May 18, 1983	Lincoln Trail College	Robinson, Illinois	Illinois	Active	
**Alpha Iota Zeta**	May 26, 1983	Northern Virginia Community College, Manassas Campus	Manassas, Virginia	Virginia	Active	
**Alpha Iota Eta**	May 17, 1983	Community College of Allegheny County, South Campus	West Mifflin, Pennsylvania	Pennsylvania	Active	
**Alpha Iota Theta**	June 10, 1983	University of Cincinnati Clermont College	Batavia, Ohio	Ohio	Active	
**Alpha Iota Kappa**	October 20, 1983	Hinds Community College, Nursing Allied Health Center	Jackson, Mississippi	Mississippi	Active	
**Alpha Iota Lambda**	January 1, 1983	Moraine Valley Community College	Palos Hills, Illinois	Illinois	Active	
**Alpha Iota Mu**	January 1, 1984	Roxbury Community College	Roxbury, Boston, Massachusetts	Massachusetts	Active	
**Alpha Iota Nu**	February 26, 1984	Connecticut State Community College Norwalk	Norwalk, Connecticut	Connecticut	Active	
**Alpha Iota Omicron**	April 29, 1984	Westchester Community College	Valhalla, New York	New York	Active	
**Alpha Iota Pi**	January 1, 1984	Flathead Valley Community College	Kalispell, Montana	Montana	Active	
**Alpha Iota Rho**	January 1, 1984	Marshalltown Community College	Marshalltown, Iowa	Iowa	Active	
**Alpha Iota Sigma**	March 31, 1984	Northern New Mexico College	Española, New Mexico	New Mexico	Active	
**Alpha Iota Tau**	May 9, 1984	Nebraska College of Technical Agriculture	Curtis, Nebraska	Nebraska	Active	
**Alpha Iota Upsilon**	January 1, 1984	Genesee Community College	Batavia, New York	New York	Active	
**Alpha Iota Chi**	September 15, 1984	Northeast State Community College	Kingsport, Tennessee	Tennessee	Active	
**Alpha Iota Phi**	November 19, 1984	Oakton College	Des Plaines, Illinois	Illinois	Active	
**Alpha Iota Omega**	September 1, 1984	Ellsworth Community College	Iowa Falls, Iowa	Iowa	Active	
**Alpha Kappa Alpha**	May 29, 1984	Normandale Community College	Bloomington, Minnesota	Minnesota	Active	
**Alpha Kappa Beta**	October 1, 1984	Jamestown Community College	Jamestown, New York	New York	Active	
**Alpha Kappa Delta**	December 2, 1984	Penn West Clarion	Oil City, Pennsylvania	Pennsylvania	Active	
**Alpha Kappa Zeta**	December 7, 1984	Montgomery County Community College, Blue Bell Campus	Blue Bell, Pennsylvania	Pennsylvania	Active	
**Alpha Kappa Eta**	November 18, 1984	Wenatchee Valley College, Omak Campus	Omak, Washington	Washington	Active	
**Alpha Kappa Theta**	December 19, 1984	Northeastern Technical College	Cheraw, South Carolina	South Carolina	Active	
**Alpha Kappa Iota**	January 1, 1985	Honolulu Community College	Honolulu, Hawaii	Hawaii	Active	
**Alpha Kappa Kappa**	January 1, 1985	County College of Morris	Randolph, New Jersey	New Jersey	Active	
**Alpha Kappa Lambda**	January 1, 1985	Massachusetts Bay Community College, Wellesley Hills Campus	Wellesley, Massachusetts	Massachusetts	Active	
**Alpha Kappa Mu**	January 1, 1985	Bunker Hill Community College	Boston, Massachusetts	Massachusetts	Active	
**Alpha Kappa Xi**	December 20, 1984	Santa Fe Community College	Santa Fe, New Mexico	New Mexico	Active	
**Alpha Kappa Omicron**	April 20, 1985	Chemeketa Community College, Salem Campus	Salem, Oregon	Oregon	Active	
**Alpha Kappa Pi**	February 21, 1985	Rockingham Community College	Wentworth, North Carolina	North Carolina	Active	
**Alpha Kappa Rho**	January 1, 1985	Southwestern Illinois College, Granite City Campus	Granite City, Illinois	Illinois	Active	
**Alpha Kappa Sigma**	May 5, 1985	Red Rocks Community College, Lakewood Campus	Lakewood, Colorda	Colorado	Active	
**Alpha Kappa Tau**	January 1, 1985	Hostos Community College	Bronx, New York	New York	Active	
**Alpha Kappa Upsilon**	June 6, 1985	Massasoit Community College	Brockton, Massachusetts	Massachusetts	Active	
**Alpha Kappa Phi**	July 1, 1985	Southwestern Oregon Community College	Coos Bay, Oregon	Oregon	Active	
**Alpha Kappa Chi**	January 1, 1985	White Mountains Community College	Berlin, New Hampshire	New Hampshire	Active	
**Alpha Kappa Psi**	January 1, 1985	Kapiʻolani Community College	Honolulu, Hawaii	Hawaii	Active	
**Alpha Kappa Omega**	September 15, 1985	Wilkes Community College, Wilkesboro Campus	Wilkesboro, North Carolina	North Carolina	Active	
**Alpha Lambda Alpha**	April 22, 1986	Hillsborough Community College, Brandon Campus	Tampa, Florida	Florida	Active	
**Alpha Lambda Beta**	September 15, 1985	Technical College of the Lowcountry, Beaufort Campus	Beaufort, South Carolina	South Carolina	Active	
**Alpha Lambda Delta**	October 30, 1985	Elizabethtown Community and Technical College	Elizabethtown, Kentucky	Kentucky	Active	
**Alpha Lambda Gamma**	September 30, 1985	Leeward Community College	Pearl City, Hawaii	Hawaii	Active	
**Alpha Lambda Epsilon**	October 1, 1985	Shawnee Community College	Ullin, Illinois	Illinois	Active	
**Alpha Lambda Zeta**	December 6, 1985	Connecticut State Community College Asnuntuck	Enfield, Connecticut	Connecticut	Active	
**Alpha Lambda Eta**	December 6, 1985	Edison State Community College	Piqua, Ohio	Ohio	Active	
**Alpha Lambda Theta**	January 8, 1986	Windward Community College	Kaneohe, Hawaii	Hawaii	Active	
**Alpha Lambda Iota**	December 20, 1985	Malcolm X College	Chicago, Illinois	Illinois	Active	
**Alpha Lambda Kappa**	January 1, 1985	North Shore Community College, Danvers Campus	Danvers, Massachusetts	Massachusetts	Active	
**Alpha Lambda Lambda**	February 17, 1986	Southern Arkansas University Tech, Camden Campus	Camden, Arkansas	Arkansas	Active	
**Alpha Lambda Mu**	April 3, 1986	Haywood Community College, Clyde Campus	Clyde, North Carolina	North Carolina	Active	
**Alpha Lambda Nu**	March 27, 1986	Community College of Allegheny County, North Campus	Pittsburgh, Pennsylvania	Pennsylvania	Active	
**Alpha Lambda Xi**	April 26, 1986	Lone Star College–Kingwood	Kingwood, Houston, Texas	Texas	Active	
**Alpha Lambda Omicron**	May 1, 1986	Rappahannock Community College, Warsaw Campus	Warsaw, Virginia	Virginia	Active	
**Alpha Lambda Pi**	April 25, 1986	Caldwell Community College & Technical Institute	Hudson, North Carolina	North Carolina	Active	
**Alpha Lambda Rho**	April 26, 1986	Lamar State College–Port Arthur	Port Arthur, Texas	Texas	Active	
**Alpha Lambda Sigma**	May 28, 1986	Holmes Community College, Ridgeland Campus	Ridgeland, Mississippi	Mississippi	Active	
**Alpha Lambda Phi**	January 1, 1986	Joliet Junior College	Joliet, Illinois	Illinois	Active	
**Alpha Lambda Chi**	May 30, 1986	Central Wyoming College	Riverton, Wyoming	Wyoming	Active	
**Alpha Lambda Psi**	May 16, 1986	Germanna Community College, Locust Grove Campus	Fredericksburg, Virginia	Virginia	Active	
**Alpha Lambda Omega**	May 14, 1986	State Fair Community College	Sedalia, Missouri	Missouri	Active	
**Alpha Mu Beta**	May 28, 1986	Holmes Community College, Grenada Campus	Grenada, Mississippi	Mississippi	Active	
**Alpha Mu Gamma**	January 1, 1986	Connecticut State Community College Three Rivers	Norwich, Connecticut	Connecticut	Active	
**Alpha Mu Delta**	April 8, 1987	Hocking College	Nelsonville, Ohio	Ohio	Active	
**Alpha Mu Epsilon**	October 17, 1987	Terra State Community College	Fremont, Ohio	Ohio	Active	
**Alpha Mu Zeta**	January 1, 1986	Cochise College, Sierra Vista Campus	Sierra Vista, Arizona	Arizona	Active	
**Alpha Mu Eta**	October 1, 1986	Mitchell College	New London, Connecticut	Connecticut	Active	
**Alpha Mu Theta**	September 1, 1986	Community College of Allegheny County, Allegheny Campus	Allegheny West, Pittsburgh, Pennsylvania	Pennsylvania	Active	
**Alpha Mu Mu**	January 3, 1986	Community College of Denver	Denver, Colorado	Colorado	Active	
**Alpha Mu Xi**	December 1, 1986	Ohio State University Agricultural Technical Institute	Wooster, Ohio	Ohio	Active	
**Alpha Mu Omicron**	January 17, 1987	Washburn University	Topeka, Kansas	Kansas	Active	
**Alpha Mu Pi**	January 19, 1987	Eastern New Mexico University	Roswell, New Mexico	New Mexico	Active	
**Alpha Mu Rho**	February 1, 1987	Forsyth Technical Community College	Winston-Salem, North Carolina	North Carolina	Active	
**Alpha Mu Sigma**	March 1, 1987	San Juan College	Farmington, New Mexico	New Mexico	Active	
**Alpha Mu Upsilon**	March 1, 1987	State College of Florida, Venice	Venice, Florida	Florida	Active	
**Alpha Mu Phi**	March 2, 1987	Wade College	Dallas, Texas	Texas	Active	
**Alpha Mu Chi**	March 1, 1987	Northeast Texas Community College	Mount Pleasant, Texas	Texas	Active	
**Alpha Mu Psi**	April 1, 1987	Front Range Community College	Westminster, Colorado	Colorado	Active	
**Alpha Mu Omega**	April 1, 1987	University of Wisconsin–Green Bay, Sheboygan Campus	Sheboygan, Wisconsin	Wisconsin	Active	
**Alpha Nu Beta**	April 1, 1987	New Mexico State University Alamogordo	Alamogordo, New Mexico	New Mexico	Active	
**Alpha Nu Gamma**	May 1, 1987	Lamar State College–Orange	Orange, Texas	Texas	Active	
**Alpha Nu Delta**	May 1, 1988	SUNY Erie, North Campus	Williamsville, New York	New York	Active	
**Alpha Nu Epsilon**	May 1, 1987	Connecticut State Community College Northwestern	Winsted, Connecticut	Connecticut	Active	
**Alpha Nu Zeta**	May 1, 1987	Big Sandy Community and Technical College	Prestonsburg, Kentucky	Kentucky	Active	
**Alpha Nu Eta**	May 6, 1987	Kellogg Community College	Battle Creek, Michigan	Michigan	Active	
**Alpha Nu Iota**	May 1, 1987	Nicolet College	Rhinelander, Wisconsin	Wisconsin	Active	
**Alpha Nu Kappa**	May 1, 1987	Minnesota West Community and Technical College, Worthington Campus	Worthington, Minnesota	Minnesota	Active	
**Alpha Nu Lambda**	May 1, 1987	Clark State College	Springfield, Ohio	Ohio	Active	
**Alpha Nu Mu**	May 1, 1987	Camden County College, Blackwood Campus	Blackwood, New Jersey	New Jersey	Active	
**Alpha Nu Xi**	September 1, 1987	College of the Canyons, Valencia Campus	Valencia, Santa Clarita, California	California	Active	
**Alpha Nu Omicron**	September 1, 1987	Wor–Wic Community College	Salisbury, Maryland	Maryland	Active	
Alpha Nu Pi	October 1, 1987 – 2024	University of Wisconsin–Oshkosh, Fond du Lac Campus	Fond du Lac, Wisconsin	Wisconsin	Inactive	(Note: The campus closed in May 2024.)
**Alpha Nu Sigma**	December 1, 1987	Horry-Georgetown Technical College	Conway, South Carolina	South Carolina	Active	
**Alpha Nu Tau**	June 1, 1988	Wilson Community College	Wilson, North Carolina	North Carolina	Active	
**Alpha Nu Phi**	February 1, 1988	Walla Walla Community College	Walla Walla, Washington	Washington	Active	
**Alpha Nu Chi**	February 25, 1988	SUNY Orange, Middletown Campus	Middletown, New York	New York	Active	
**Alpha Nu Psi**	February 1, 1988	Gillette College	Gillette, Wyoming	Wyoming	Active	
**Alpha Nu Omega**	March 20, 1988	Harrisburg Area Community College, Harrisburg Campus	Harrisburg, Pennsylvania	Pennsylvania	Active	
**Alpha Xi Beta**	April 1, 1988	College of Southern Nevada, Charleston Campus	Las Vegas, Nevada	Nevada	Active	
**Alpha Xi Gamma**	April 1, 1988	Owensboro Community and Technical College	Owensboro, Kentucky	Kentucky	Active	
**Alpha Xi Delta**	May 6, 1988	Bay College, Escanaba Campus	Escanaba, Michigan	Michigan	Active	
**Alpha Xi Epsilon**	March 1, 1988	Dawson Community College	Glendive, Montana	Montana	Active	
**Alpha Xi Zeta**	April 1, 1988	Clackamas Community College	Oregon City, Oregon	Oregon	Active	
**Alpha Xi Eta**	April 1, 1988	St. Johns River State College, St Augustine Campus	St. Augustine, Florida	Florida	Active	
**Alpha Xi Theta**	April 1, 1988	Connecticut State Community College Gateway	New Haven, Connecticut	Connecticut	Active	
**Alpha Xi Iota**	May 1, 1988	Gateway Technical College, Kenosha Campus	Kenosha, Wisconsin	Wisconsin	Active	
**Alpha Xi Lambda**	June 1, 1988	Aiken Technical College	Graniteville, South Carolina	South Carolina	Active	
**Alpha Xi Mu**	June 8, 1988	Henry Ford College	Dearborn, Michigan	Michigan	Active	
**Alpha Xi Nu**	May 1, 1988	Whatcom Community College, Bellingham Campus	Bellingham, Washington	Washington	Active	
**Alpha Xi Xi**	April 1, 1989	Blue Ridge Community College	Weyers Cave, Virginia	Virginia	Active	
**Alpha Xi Omicron**	July 1, 1988	Pamlico Community College	Grantsboro, North Carolina	North Carolina	Active	
**Alpha Xi Pi**	August 1, 1988	Motlow State Community College, Moore County Campus	Lynchburg, Tennessee	Tennessee	Active	
**Alpha Xi Sigma**	November 1, 1988	Hudson Valley Community College, Troy Campus	Troy, New York	New York	Active	
**Alpha Xi Tau**	December 1, 1988	Surry Community College	Dobson, North Carolina	North Carolina	Active	
**Alpha Xi Upsilon**	November 1, 1988	Garden City Community College	Garden City, Kansas	Kansas	Active	
**Alpha Xi Phi**	November 1, 1988	South Puget Sound Community College, Olympia Campus	Tumwater, Washington	Washington	Active	
**Alpha Xi Chi**	November 1, 1988	St. Charles Community College, St. Charles Campus	Cottleville, Missouri	Missouri	Active	
**Alpha Xi Psi**	November 20, 1988	Nashville State Community College	Nashville, Tennessee	Tennessee	Active	
**Alpha Xi Omega**	September 1, 1988	Holyoke Community College	Holyoke, Massachusetts	Massachusetts	Active	
**Alpha Omicron Alpha**	November 1, 1988	Lehigh Carbon Community College	Schnecksville, Pennsylvania	Pennsylvania	Active	
**Alpha Omicron Beta**	December 1, 1988	Inver Hills Community College	Inver Grove Heights, Minnesota	Minnesota	Active	
**Alpha Omicron Gamma**	April 14, 1989	Kirtland Community College, Grayling	Grayling, Michigan	Michigan	Active	
**Alpha Omicron Delta**	February 1, 1989	Alamance Community College	Graham, North Carolina	North Carolina	Active	
**Alpha Omicron Epsilon**	February 1, 1989	Georgia Military College	Milledgeville, Georgia	Georgia	Active	
**Alpha Omicron Zeta**	February 1, 1989	Morgan Community College	Fort Morgan, Colorado	Colorado	Active	
**Alpha Omicron Eta**	March 1, 1989	Southern State Community College, Central Campus	Hillsboro, Ohio	Ohio	Active	
**Alpha Omicron Iota**	October 27, 1989	Mott Community College	Flint, Michigan	Michigan	Active	
**Alpha Omicron Kappa**	April 1, 1989	Oakland Community College, Highland Lakes Campus	Royal Oak, Michigan	Michigan	Active	
**Alpha Omicron Lambda**	April 1, 1989	Eastern Wyoming College	Torrington, Wyoming	Wyoming	Active	
**Alpha Omicron Mu**	April 1, 1989	Northwest State Community College	Archbold, Ohio	Ohio	Active	
**Alpha Omicron Nu**	April 1, 1989	Eastern Gateway Community College, Jefferson County Campus	Steubenville, Ohio	Ohio	Active	
**Alpha Omicron Omicron**	April 28, 1989	Mid Michigan College	Harrison, Michigan	Michigan	Active	
**Alpha Omicron Pi**	May 10, 1989	Coahoma Community College, Clarksdale Campus	Clarksdale, Mississippi	Mississippi	Active	
**Alpha Omicron Sigma**	May 1, 1989	Skagit Valley College, Whidbey Island Campus	Oak Harbor, Washington	Washington	Active	
**Alpha Omicron Tau**	May 1, 1989	Iowa Western Community College	Council Bluffs, Iowa	Iowa	Active	
**Alpha Omicron Upsilon**	May 2, 1989	North Central Michigan College	Petoskey, Michigan	Michigan	Active	
**Alpha Omicron Phi**	May 1, 1989	Garrett College	McHenry, Maryland	Maryland	Active	
**Alpha Omicron Chi**	May 1, 1989	Paradise Valley Community College	Phoenix, Arizona	Arizona	Active	
**Alpha Omicron Omega**	April 1, 1989	Hinds Community College, Rankin Campus	Pearl, Mississippi	Mississippi	Active	
**Alpha Pi Alpha**	May 1, 1989	Guilford Technical Community College, Jamestown Campus	Jamestown, North Carolina	North Carolina	Active	
**Alpha Pi Beta**	May 1, 1989	SUNY Niagara	Sanborn, New York	New York	Active	
**Alpha Pi Gamma**	September 1, 1989	Truckee Meadows Community College, Dandini Main Campus	Reno, Nevada	Nevada	Active	
**Alpha Pi Delta**	May 1, 1989	Los Angeles Pierce College	Woodland Hills, Los Angeles, California	California	Active	
**Alpha Pi Epsilon**	May 1, 1989	Southwestern College, Chula Vista Campus	La Mesa, California	California	Active	
**Alpha Pi Eta**	September 1, 1989	Trocaire College	Buffalo, New York	New York	Active	
**Alpha Pi Theta**	September 1, 1989	Brookdale Community College	Lincroft, New Jersey	New Jersey	Active	
**Alpha Pi Iota**	September 1, 1989	Palo Alto College	San Antonio, Texas	Texas	Active	
**Alpha Pi Lambda**	September 1, 1989	Southeast Community College, Lincoln Campus	Lincoln, Nebraska	Nebraska	Active	
**Alpha Pi Nu**	November 1, 1989	Oklahoma State University–Oklahoma City	Oklahoma City, Oklahoma	Oklahoma	Active	
**Alpha Pi Xi**	November 1, 1989	Kauaʻi Community College	Lihue, Hawaii	Hawaii	Active	
**Alpha Pi Omicron**	November 1, 1989	Cuyamaca College, El Cajon Campus	El Cajon, California	California	Active	
**Alpha Pi Pi**	November 1, 1989	Community College of Aurora	Aurora, Colorado	Colorado	Active	
**Alpha Pi Rho**	November 1, 1989	Manchester Community College	Manchester, New Hampshire.	New Hampshire	Active	
**Alpha Pi Sigma**	November 1, 1989	Metropolitan Community College, Blue River Campus	Independence, Missouri	Missouri	Active	
**Alpha Pi Tau**	December 1, 1989	Clinton Community College	Plattsburgh, New York	New York	Active	
**Alpha Pi Upsilon**	February 1, 1990	Missouri State University–West Plains	West Plains, Missouri	Missouri	Active	
**Alpha Pi Phi**	January 24, 1990	Alexandria Technical and Community College	Alexandria, Minnesota	Minnesota	Active	
**Alpha Pi Chi**	February 9, 1990	Eastern Shore Community College	Melfa, Virginia	Virginia	Active	
**Alpha Pi Psi**	April 1, 1990	Quincy College	Quincy, Massachusetts	Massachusetts	Active	
**Alpha Pi Omega**	February 1, 1990	Salem Community College	Carneys Point Township, New Jersey	New Jersey	Active	
**Alpha Rho Gamma**	March 1, 1990	Washington State College of Ohio	Marietta, Ohio	Ohio	Active	
**Alpha Rho Delta**	March 1, 1990	SUNY Ulster	Stone Ridge, New York	New York	Active	
**Alpha Rho Epsilon**	March 1, 1990	Columbus State Community College	Columbus, Ohio	Ohio	Active	
**Alpha Rho Zeta**	March 1, 1990	Waukesha County Technical College	Pewaukee, Wisconsin	Wisconsin	Active	
**Alpha Rho Eta**	March 1, 1990	Kishwaukee College	Malta, Illinois	Illinois	Active	
**Alpha Rho Theta**	March 1, 1990	Pueblo Community College	Pueblo, Colorado	Colorado	Active	
**Alpha Rho Iota**	April 1, 1990	Williston State College	Williston, North Dakota	North Dakota	Active	
**Alpha Rho Kappa**	April 1, 1990	Colorado Mountain College, Steamboat Springs Campus	Steamboat Springs, Colorado	Colorado	Active	
**Alpha Rho Lambda**	April 10, 1990	Jackson College, Central Campus	Summit Township, Michigan	Michigan	Active	
**Alpha Rho Mu**	April 1, 1990	Lone Star College–Tomball	Tomball, Texas	Texas	Active	
**Alpha Rho Nu**	April 29, 1990	Kalamazoo Valley Community College, Texas Township Campus	Kalamazoo, Michigan	Michigan	Active	
**Alpha Rho Xi**	April 1, 1990	Southeast New Mexico College, Carlsbad Campus	Carlsbad, New Mexico	New Mexico	Active	
**Alpha Rho Pi**	April 26, 1990	Northwestern Michigan College	Traverse City, Michigan	Michigan	Active	
**Alpha Rho Sigma**	May 5, 1990	Ivy Tech Community College, Bloomington Campus	Bloomngton, Indiana	Indiana	Active	
**Alpha Rho Tau**	May 1, 1990	Ivy Tech Community College, Columbus Campus	Columbus, Indiana	Indiana	Active	
**Alpha Rho Upsilon**	May 1, 1990	Blue Ridge Community College, Henderson County Campus	Flat Rock, North Carolina	North Carolina	Active	
**Alpha Rho Phi**	May 1, 1990	Bossier Parish Community College	Bossier City, Louisiana	Louisiana	Active	
**Alpha Rho Chi**	May 4, 1990	Gogebic Community College	Ironwood, Michigan	Michigan	Active	
**Alpha Rho Psi**	May 1, 1990	Community College of Baltimore County, Catonsville Campus	Catonsville, Maryland	Maryland	Active	
**Alpha Rho Omega**	May 1, 1990	South Georgia State College, Waycross Campus	Douglas, Georgia	Georgia	Active	
**Alpha Sigma Alpha**	May 1, 1990	De Anza College	Cupertino, California	California	Active	
**Alpha Sigma Gamma**	June 1, 1990	Williamsburg Technical College	Kingstree, South Carolina	South Carolina	Active	
**Alpha Sigma Delta**	September 1, 1990	Merced College	Merced, California	California	Active	
**Alpha Sigma Zeta**	August 1, 1990	Onondaga Community College	Syracuse, New York	New York	Active	
**Alpha Sigma Theta**	November 1, 1990	Utah Valley University	Orem, Utah	Utah	Active	
**Alpha Sigma Iota**	January 1, 1990	Louisiana State University at Eunice	Eunice, Louisiana	Louisiana	Active	
**Alpha Sigma Kappa**	November 1, 1990	Ivy Tech Community College, Lafayette Campus	Lafayette, Louisiana	Indiana	Active	
**Alpha Sigma Lambda**	November 1, 1990	University of Wisconsin–Green Bay, Manitowoc Campus	Manitowoc, Wisconsin	Wisconsin	Active	
**Alpha Sigma Mu**	April 23, 1991	Alfred State College	Alfred, New York	New York	Active	
**Alpha Sigma Nu**	November 26, 1990	Chandler–Gilbert Community College, Pecos Campus	Chandler, Arizona	Arizona	Active	
**Alpha Sigma Xi**	November 1, 1990	Columbia Gorge Community College	The Dalles, Oregon	Oregon	Active	
**Alpha Sigma Omicron**	December 1, 1990	Greenfield Community College	Greenfield, Massachusetts	Massachusetts	Active	
**Alpha Sigma Pi**	December 1, 1990	Chesapeake College	Wye Mills, Maryland	Maryland	Active	
**Alpha Sigma Rho**	December 1, 1990	Reading Area Community College	Reading, Pennsylvania	Pennsylvania	Active	
**Alpha Sigma Upsilon**	January 31, 1991	Umpqua Community College	Roseburg, Oregon	Oregon	Active	
**Alpha Sigma Chi**	February 1, 1991	Vance–Granville Community College	Henderson, North Carolina	North Carolina	Active	
**Alpha Sigma Phi**	February 1, 1991	Clark College	Vancouver, Washington	Washington	Active	
**Alpha Tau Alpha**	February 24, 1991	Montcalm Community College	Sidney, Michigan	Michigan	Active	
**Alpha Tau Beta**	February 1, 1991	Sandhills Community College	Pinehurst, North Carolina	North Carolina	Active	
**Alpha Tau Gamma**	March 1, 1991	John Wood Community College	Quincy, Illinois	Illinois	Active	
**Alpha Tau Epsilon**	April 1, 1991	Delaware County Community College, Media/Marple Campus	Media, Pennsylvania	Pennsylvania	Active	
**Alpha Tau Zeta**	March 1, 1991	Athens Technical College	Athens, Georgia	Georgia	Active	
**Alpha Tau Eta**	April 1, 1991	Florida SouthWestern State College, Charlotte Campus	Punta Gorda, Florida	Florida	Active	
**Alpha Tau Theta**	April 1, 1991	Howard College, San Angelo Campus	San Angelo, Texas	Texas	Active	
**Alpha Tau Kappa**	April 1, 1991	Front Range Community College, Larimer Campus	Fort Collins, Colorado	Colorado	Active	
**Alpha Tau Lambda**	April 1, 1991	BridgeValley Community and Technical College, South Charleston Campus	South Charleston, West Virginia.	West Virginia	Active	
**Alpha Tau Mu**	May 1, 1991	Rhodes State College	Lima, Ohio	Ohio	Active	
**Alpha Tau Nu**	May 2, 1991	Clovis Community College	Clovis, New Mexico	New Mexico	Active	
**Alpha Tau Xi**	May 1, 1991	Ivy Tech Community College, Fort Wayne Campus	Fort Wayne, Indiana	Indiana	Active	
**Alpha Tau Pi**	April 1, 1991	Pierpont Community and Technical College	Fairmont, West Virginia	West Virginia	Active	
**Alpha Tau Rho**	May 1, 1991	Coastal Carolina Community College	Jacksonville, North Carolina	North Carolina	Active	
**Alpha Tau Sigma**	May 1, 1991	Ivy Tech Community College, Sellersburg Campus	Sellersburg, Indiana	Indiana	Active	
**Alpha Tau Tau**	May 1, 1991	Central Community College, Grand Island Campus	Grand Island, Nebraska	Nebraska	Active	
**Alpha Tau Upsilon**	May 1, 1991	Linn–Benton Community College	Albany, Oregon	Oregon	Active	
**Alpha Tau Phi**	May 1, 1991	Fayetteville Technical Community College	Fayetteville, North Carolina	North Carolina	Active	
**Alpha Tau Chi**	May 1, 1991	Ranken Technical College	St. Louis, Missouri	Missouri	Active	
**Alpha Upsilon Alpha**	May 1, 1991	Connecticut State Community College Manchester	Manchester, Connecticut	Connecticut	Active	
**Alpha Upsilon Beta**	May 1, 1991	Western Nevada College	Carson City, Nevada	Nevada	Active	
**Alpha Upsilon Gamma**	May 1, 1991	Lake Superior College	Duluth, Minnesota	Minnesota	Active	
**Alpha Upsilon Epsilon**	June 1, 1991	Berkeley College, Woodland Park Campus	Woodland Park, New Jersey	New Jersey	Active	
**Alpha Upsilon Zeta**	June 5, 1991	Wayne County Community College, Downtown Campus	Detroit, Michigan	Michigan	Active	
**Alpha Upsilon Eta**	August 1, 1991	Asheville–Buncombe Technical Community College	Asheville, North Carolina	North Carolina	Active	
**Alpha Upsilon Theta**	October 24, 1991	Piedmont Community College	Roxboro, North Carolina	North Carolina	Active	
**Alpha Upsilon Kappa**	November 15, 1991	Grand Rapids Community College	Grand Rapids, Michigan	Michigan	Active	
**Alpha Upsilon Lambda**	November 15, 1991	Ivy Tech Community College	Muncie, Indiana	Indiana	Active	
**Alpha Upsilon Mu**	November 17, 1991	Cape Cod Community College	West Barnstable, Massachusetts	Massachusetts	Active	
**Alpha Upsilon Nu**	November 20, 1991	Florida SouthWestern State College, Collier Campus	Naples, Florida	Florida	Active	
**Alpha Upsilon Omicron**	December 8, 1991	NHTI – Concord's Community College	Concord, New Hampshire	New Hampshire	Active	
**Alpha Upsilon Pi**	November 22, 1991	Sussex County Community College, Newton Campus	Newton, New Jersey	New Jersey	Active	
**Alpha Upsilon Rho**	December 8, 1991	Warren County Community College, Washington Campus	Washington Township, New Jersey	New Jersey	Active	
**Alpha Upsilon Sigma**	December 8, 1991	Jefferson Community and Technical College, Southwest Campus	Valley Station, Louisville, Kentucky	Kentucky	Active	
**Alpha Upsilon Tau**	December 15, 1991	Ivy Tech Community College, Indianapolis Campus	Indianapolis, Indiana	Indiana	Active	
**Alpha Upsilon Upsilon**	December 13, 1991	Westmoreland County Community College	Youngwood, Pennsylvania	Pennsylvania	Active	
**Alpha Upsilon Phi**	December 13, 1991	Great Bay Community College, Stratham Campus	Portsmouth, New Hampshire	New Hampshire	Active	
**Alpha Upsilon Chi**	December 13, 1991	Central New Mexico Community College	Albuquerque, New Mexico	New Mexico	Active	
**Alpha Upsilon Omega**	January 24, 1992	Ivy Tech Community College, Richmond Campus	Richmond, Indiana	Indiana	Active	
**Alpha Phi Alpha**	January 19, 1992	Butler Community College	Andover, Kansas	Kansas	Active	
**Alpha Phi Beta**	January 31, 1992	Black Hawk College, East Campus	Galva, Illinois	Illinois	Active	
**Alpha Phi Gamma**	February 1, 1992	Victor Valley College	Victorville, California	California	Active	
**Alpha Phi Epsilon**	April 25, 1992	Northern Maine Community College	Presque Isle, Maine	Maine	Active	
**Alpha Phi Zeta**	February 25, 1992	Valencia College, Osceola Campus	Kissimmee, Florida	Florida	Active	
**Alpha Phi Eta**	April 2, 1992	Ivy Tech Community College, Terre Haute Campus	Terre Haute, Indiana	Indiana	Active	
**Alpha Phi Theta**	April 26, 1992	Ivy Tech Community College, Evansville Campus	Evansville, Indiana	Indiana	Active	
**Alpha Phi Kappa**	April 8, 1992	Bluegrass Community and Technical College, Cooper Campus	Lexington, Kentucky	Kentucky	Active	
**Alpha Phi Lambda**	April 3, 1992	Blinn College, Bryan Campus	Bryan, Texas	Texas	Active	
**Alpha Phi Mu**	March 20, 1992	Southern New Hampshire University	Manchester, New Hampshire	New Hampshire	Active	
**Alpha Phi Nu**	April 30, 1992	Craven Community College	New Bern, North Carolina	North Carolina	Active	
**Alpha Phi Xi**	April 27, 1992	Central Maine Community College	Auburn, Maine	Maine	Active	
**Alpha Phi Omicron**	April 15, 1992	State Technical College of Missouri	Linn, Missouri	Missouri	Active	
**Alpha Phi Pi**	April 11, 1992	Ivy Tech Community College, Kokomo Campus	Kokomo, Indiana	Indiana	Active	
**Alpha Phi Sigma**	May 7, 1992	Rockland Community College, Suffern Campus	West Nyack, New York	New York	Active	
**Alpha Phi Upsilon**	May 13, 1992	Fond du Lac Tribal and Community College	Cloquet, Minnesota	Minnesota	Active	
**Alpha Phi Phi**	April 26, 1992	West Shore Community College	Scottville, Michigan	Michigan	Active	
**Alpha Phi Psi**	May 1, 1992	Colorado Northwestern Community College, Craig Campus	Rangely, Colorado	Colorado	Active	
**Alpha Phi Omega**	May 8, 1992	Ivy Tech Community College, Lake County Campus	Crown Point, Indiana	Indiana	Active	
**Alpha Chi Alpha**	June 5, 1992	College of Alameda	Alameda, California	California	Active	
**Alpha Chi Beta**	June 1, 1992	Green River College	Auburn, Washington	Washington	Active	
**Alpha Chi Gamma**	May 21, 1992	Martin Community College	Williamston, North Carolina	North Carolina	Active	
**Alpha Chi Delta**	June 5, 1992	Augusta Technical College	Augusta, Georgia	Georgia	Active	
**Alpha Chi Epsilon**	May 14, 1992	Lakes Region Community College	Laconia, New Hampshire	New Hampshire	Active	
**Alpha Chi Zeta**	June 8, 1992	Seattle Central College	Seattle, Washington	Washington	Active	
**Alpha Chi Eta**	June 6, 1992	Salt Lake Community College, Taylorsville Redwood Campus	South Salt Lake, Utah	Utah	Active	
**Alpha Chi Theta**	June 5, 1992	Laney College	Oakland, California	California	Active	
**Alpha Chi Kappa**	December 10, 1992	Nashua Community College	Nashua, New Hampshire	New Hampshire	Active	
**Alpha Chi Lambda**	October 28, 1992	MiraCosta College, Oceanside Campus	Oceanside, California	California	Active	
**Alpha Chi Mu**	November 19, 1992	Porterville College	Porterville, California	California	Active	
**Alpha Chi Nu**	October 15, 1992	Southern Maine Community College	South Portland, Maine	Maine	Active	
**Alpha Chi Xi**	December 6, 1992	Columbia Basin College	Pasco, Washington	Washington	Active	
**Alpha Chi Pi**	November 1, 1992	Florence–Darlington Technical College	Florence, South Carolina	South Carolina	Active	
**Alpha Chi Sigma**	November 19, 1992	Cape Fear Community College	Wilmington, North Carolina	North Carolina	Active	
**Alpha Chi Tau**	December 10, 1992	Wallace State Community College	Hanceville, Alabama.	Alabama	Active	
**Alpha Chi Upsilon**	February 16, 1993	Texas State Technical College, Sweetwater Campus	Abilene, Texas	Texas	Active	
**Alpha Chi Phi**	February 16, 1993	South Seattle College, South Campus	Seattle, Washington	Washington	Active	
**Alpha Chi Chi**	February 10, 1993	Mohave Community College, Lake Havasu Campus	Lake Havasu City, Arizona	Arizona	Active	
**Alpha Chi Psi**	February 11, 1993	Mohave Community College, Bullhead City Campus	Bullhead City, Arizona	Arizona	Active	
**Alpha Chi Omega**	February 12, 1993	Mohave Community College, Neal Campus	Kingman, Arizona	Arizona	Active	
**Alpha Psi Beta**	April 25, 1993	North Iowa Area Community College	Mason City, Iowa	Iowa	Active	
**Alpha Psi Delta**	April 9, 1993	Pierce College, Puyallup Campus	Puyallup, Washington	Washington	Active	
**Alpha Psi Gamma**	May 15, 1993	Prince William Sound College	Valdez, Alaska	Alaska	Active	
**Alpha Psi Epsilon**	April 23, 1993	Hawaiʻi Community College, Hilo Campus	Hilo, Hawaii	Hawaii	Active	
**Alpha Psi Epsilon**	April 23, 1993	Hawaii Community College, Palamanui Campus	Kailua-Kona, Hawaii	Hawaii	Active	
**Alpha Psi Zeta**	May 3, 1993	Feather River College	Quincy, California	California	Active	
**Alpha Psi Eta**	May 5, 1993	Parkland College	Champaign, Illinois	Illinois	Active	
**Alpha Psi Iota**	May 13, 1993	Laurel Ridge Community College, Fauquier Campus	Warrenton, Virginia	Virginia	Active	
**Alpha Psi Kappa**	May 20, 1993	Dutchess Community College	Poughkeepsie, New York	New York	Active	
**Alpha Psi Lambda**	July 18, 1993	Ivy Tech Community College	Madison, Indiana	Indiana	Active	
**Alpha Psi Mu**	June 10, 1993	Pennsylvania Institute of Technology, Media Campus	Upper Providence Township, Pennsylvania	Pennsylvania	Active	
**Alpha Psi Xi**	October 31, 1993	Bevill State Community College, Hamilton Campus	Hamilton, Alabama	Alabama	Active	
**Alpha Psi Omicron**	January 24, 1994	Georgia Highlands College, Rome Campus	Marietta, Georgia	Georgia	Active	
**Alpha Psi Pi**	May 5, 1994	Rowan College of South Jersey, Gloucester Campus	Sewell, New Jersey	New Jersey	Active	
**Alpha Psi Rho**	December 12, 1993	Lakeland Community College, Kirtland Campus	Kirtland, Ohio	Ohio	Active	
**Alpha Psi Sigma**	November 21, 1993	Springfield Technical Community College	Springfield, Massachusetts	Massachusetts	Active	
**Alpha Psi Tau**	November 9, 1993	Ozarks Technical Community College	Springfield, Missouri	Missouri	Active	
**Alpha Psi Upsilon**	October 28, 1993	Stanly Community College	Albemarle, North Carolina	North Carolina	Active	
**Alpha Psi Psi**	January 28, 1994	Carroll Community College	Westminster, Maryland	Maryland	Active	
**Alpha Psi Omega**	April 15, 1994	Jamestown Community College, Cattaraugus County Campus	Olean, New York	New York	Active	
**Alpha Omega Alpha**	April 23, 1994	Mt. San Antonio College	Walnut, California	California	Active	
**Alpha Omega Beta**	March 18, 1994	St. Petersburg College, Health Education Center	St. Petersburg, FLorida	Florida	Active	
**Alpha Omega Gamma**	April 1, 1994	Ashland Community and Technical College	Ashland, Kentucky	Kentucky	Active	
**Alpha Omega Delta**	February 27, 1994	Ivy Tech Community College, Anderson Campus	Anderson, Indiana	Indiana	Active	
**Alpha Omega Epsilon**	April 21, 1994	Lethbridge Polytechnic	Lethbridge, Alberta, Canada	Alberta	Active	
**Alpha Omega Zeta**	April 26, 1994	Laramie County Community College	Cheyenne, Wyoming,	Wyoming	Active	
**Alpha Omega Theta**	April 13, 1994	Donnelly College	Kansas City, Kansas	Kansas	Active	
**Alpha Omega Iota**	March 6, 1994	Southwest Texas Junior College, Del Rio Campus	Del Rio, Texas	Texas	Active	
**Alpha Omega Lambda**	April 14, 1994	Mendocino College	Ukiah, California	California	Active	
**Alpha Omega Mu**	May 6, 1994	Irvine Valley College	Irvine, California	California	Active	
**Alpha Omega Nu**	May 6, 1994	Edgecombe Community College	Tarboro, North Carolina	North Carolina	Active	
**Alpha Omega Xi**	March 27, 1994	Heartland Community College	Normal, Illinois	Illinois	Active	
**Alpha Omega Omicron**	April 27, 1994	Kenai Peninsula College, Soldotna Campus	Soldotna, Alaska	Alaska	Active	
**Alpha Omega Pi**	April 22, 1994	Owens Community College, Toledo Area Campus	Perrysburg, Ohio	Ohio	Active	
**Alpha Omega Rho**	May 20, 1994	Palomar College, San Marcos Campus	San Marcos, California	California	Active	
**Alpha Omega Sigma**	April 29, 1994	Arkansas State University Three Rivers	Malvern, Arkansas	Arkansas	Active	
**Alpha Omega Tau**	April 27, 1994	Doña Ana Community College	Las Cruces, New Mexico	New Mexico	Active	
**Alpha Omega Upsilon**	May 6, 1994	Bevill State Community College	Sumiton, Alabama	Alabama	Active	
**Alpha Omega Phi**	June 1, 1994	Yakima Valley College	Yakima, Washington	Washington	Active	
**Alpha Omega Chi**	May 18, 1994	Hinds Community College, Vicksburg Campus	Vicksburg, Mississippi	Mississippi	Active	
**Alpha Omega Psi**	May 23, 1994	South Piedmont Community College, L.L. Polk Campus	Polkton, North Carolina	North Carolina	Active	
**Alpha Omega Omega**	August 13, 1994	Texas State Technical College, Waco Campus	Waco, Texas	Texas	Active	
**Beta Alpha Alpha**	November 3, 1994	Oklahoma State University Institute of Technology	Okmulgee, Oklahoma	Oklahoma	Active	
**Beta Alpha Beta**	October 29, 1994	Cerritos College	Norwalk, California	California	Active	
**Beta Alpha Gamma**	January 21, 1995	Sauk Valley Community College	Dixon, Illinois	Illinois	Active	
**Beta Alpha Delta**	November 3, 1994	Central Community College, Hastings Campus	Hastings, Nebraska	Nebraska	Active	
**Beta Alpha Epsilon**	December 20, 1994	Landmark College	Putney, Vermont	Vermont	Active	
**Beta Alpha Zeta**	December 6, 1994	Wake Technical Community College, Main Campus	Raleigh, North Carolina	North Carolina	Active	
**Beta Alpha Eta**	November 20, 1994	Ozarka College	Melbourne, Arkansas	Arkansas	Active	
**Beta Alpha Iota**	December 10, 1994	Miami Dade College, Homestead Campus	Homestead, Florida	Florida	Active	
**Beta Alpha Kappa**	December 7, 1994	Hawkeye Community College	Waterloo, Iowa	Iowa	Active	
**Beta Alpha Lambda**	December 18, 1994	Frontier Community College	Fairfield, Illinois	Illinois	Active	
**Beta Alpha Nu**	December 16, 1994	Bakersfield College	Bakersfield, California	California	Active	
**Beta Alpha Xi**	February 17, 1995	Estrella Mountain Community College	Avondale, Arizona	Arizona	Active	
**Beta Alpha Rho**	February 17, 1995	Maysville Community and Technical College	Maysville, Kentucky	Kentucky	Active	
**Beta Alpha Sigma**	February 28, 1995	Berkeley College, NYC Midtown Campus	Midtown Manhattan, New York	New York	Active	
**Beta Alpha Tau**	March 26, 1995	Community College of Baltimore County, Dundalk Campus	Baltimore, Maryland	Maryland	Active	
**Beta Alpha Upsilon**	April 6, 1995	Community College of Beaver County, Monaca Campus	Monaca, Pennsylvania	Pennsylvania	Active	
**Beta Alpha Phi**	March 31, 1995	Hudson County Community College	Jersey City, New Jersey	New Jersey	Active	
**Beta Alpha Chi**	March 2, 1995	Roane State Community College, Oak Ridge Campus	Oak Ridge, Tennessee	Tennessee	Active	
**Beta Alpha Psi**	April 1, 1995	Pensacola State College, Warrington Campus	Pensacola, Florida	Florida	Active	
**Beta Alpha Omega**	March 26, 1995	University of Indianapolis	Indianapolis, Indiana	Indiana	Active	
**Beta Beta Alpha**	March 12, 1995	Ivy Tech Community College, Elkhart County Campus	Goshen, Indiana	Indiana	Active	
**Beta Beta Beta**	March 19, 1995	Marian University's Ancilla College, Donaldson Campus	Donaldson, Indiana	Indiana	Active	
**Beta Beta Gamma**	April 1, 1995	Pensacola State College, Milton Campus	Milton, Florida	Florida	Active	
**Beta Beta Delta**	March 25, 1995	North Arkansas College	Harrison, Arkansas	Arkansas	Active	
**Beta Beta Epsilon**	April 23, 1995	Great Basin College	Elko, Nevada	Nevada	Active	
**Beta Beta Zeta**	April 27, 1995	Corning Community College	Corning, New York	New York	Active	
**Beta Beta Theta**	May 19, 1995	Ohio University - Lancaster	Lancaster, Ohio	Ohio	Active	
**Beta Beta Iota**	April 5, 1995	Southwestern Indian Polytechnic Institute	Albuquerque, New Mexico	New Mexico	Active	
**Beta Beta Kappa**	April 19, 1995	University of Arkansas Hope-Texarkana	Hope, Arkansas	Arkansas	Active	
**Beta Beta Lambda**	May 3, 1995	Vermont Technical College, Randolph Center	Randolph Center, Vermont	Vermont	Active	(Note: VTC merged with Northern Vermont University and Castleton University to become Vermont State University in July 2023.)
**Beta Beta Mu**	April 23, 1995	Iowa Western Community College, Centers Campus	Clarinda, Iowa	Iowa	Active	
**Beta Beta Nu**	April 27, 1995	Southern University at Shreveport	Shreveport, Louisiana	Louisiana	Active	
**Beta Beta Xi**	May 16, 1995	Guam Community College, Barrigada Campus	Barrigada, Guam	Guam	Active	
**Beta Beta Omicron**	March 10, 1996	Eastern Maine Community College	Bangor, Maine	Maine	Active	
**Beta Beta Pi**	April 30, 1995	Connecticut State Community College Quinebaug Valley	Danielson, Connecticut	Connecticut	Active	
**Beta Beta Sigma**	May 19, 1995	Napa Valley College	Napa, California	California	Active	
**Beta Beta Tau**	June 6, 1995	Atlanta Metropolitan State College	Atlanta, Georgia	Georgia	Active	
**Beta Beta Upsilon**	May 27, 1995	San Diego Mesa College	Clairemont Mesa, San Diego, California	California	Active	
**Beta Beta Phi**	February 1, 1996	Texas State Technical College, Marshall Campus	Marshall, Texas	Texas	Active	
**Beta Beta Chi**	December 8, 1995	Northampton Community College, Monroe Campus	Tannersville, Pennsylvania	Pennsylvania	Active	
**Beta Beta Psi**	October 11, 1995	Madison Area Technical College, Truax Campus	Madison, Wisconsin	Wisconsin	Active	
**Beta Beta Omega**	December 13, 1995	Cossatot Community College of the University of Arkansas	De Queen, Arkansas	Arkansas	Active	
**Beta Gamma Alpha**	December 3, 1995	Washtenaw Community College	Ann Arbor Charter Township, Michigan	Michigan	Active	
**Beta Gamma Delta**	December 8, 1995	Santa Rosa Junior College	Santa Rosa, California	California	Active	
**Beta Gamma Epsilon**	January 21, 1996	Stark State College, North Canton Campus	Canton, Ohio	Ohio	Active	
**Beta Gamma Eta**	April 14, 1996	Olympic College	Bremerton, Washington	Washington	Active	
**Beta Gamma Theta**	January 19, 1996	Georgia Military College, Warner Robins Campus	Warner Robins, Georgia	Georgia	Active	
**Beta Gamma Kappa**	February 23, 1996	Spokane Falls Community College	Spokane, Washington	Washington	Active	
**Beta Gamma Lambda**	January 16, 1996	Portland Community College, Rock Creek Campus	Portland, Oregon	Oregon	Active	
**Beta Gamma Mu**	April 17, 1996	Southeast Arkansas College	Pine Bluff, Arkansas	Arkansas	Active	
**Beta Gamma Nu**	February 25, 1996	Berkeley City College	Berkeley, California	California	Active	
**Beta Gamma Xi**	March 8, 1996	Connecticut State Community College Middlesex	Middletown, Connecticut	Connecticut	Active	
**Beta Gamma Pi**	May 5, 1996	Yavapai College	Prescott, Arizona	Arizona	Active	
**Beta Gamma Rho**	March 15, 1996	Des Moines Area Community College, Newton Campus	Newton, Iowa	Iowa	Active	
**Beta Gamma Sigma**	March 29, 1996	Cincinnati State Technical and Community College	Cincinnati, Ohio	Ohio	Active	
**Beta Gamma Tau**	March 10, 1996	Ivy Tech Community College, Lawrenceburg Campus	Lawrenceburg, Indiana	Indiana	Active	
**Beta Gamma Upsilon**	March 28, 1996	Santa Barbara City College	Santa Barbara, California	California	Active	
**Beta Gamma Phi**	April 21, 1996	Lamar Institute of Technology	Beaumont, Texas	Texas	Active	
**Beta Gamma Chi**	April 26, 1996	Coconino Community College	Flagstaff, Arizona	Arizona	Active	
**Beta Gamma Omega**	May 26, 1996	Evergreen Valley College	San Jose, California	California	Active	
**Beta Delta Delta**	May 17, 1996	College of Southern Maryland, La Plata Campus	La Plata, Maryland	Maryland	Active	
**Beta Delta Epsilon**	April 13, 1996	Tillamook Bay Community College	Tillamook, Oregon	Oregon	Active	
**Beta Delta Zeta**	April 28, 1996	Blue Mountain Community College	Pendleton, Oregon	Oregon	Active	
**Beta Delta Iota**	April 30, 1996	Lone Star College–Montgomery	Conroe, Texas	Texas	Active	
**Beta Delta Kappa**	March 22, 1998	Volunteer State Community College	Gallatin, Tennessee	Tennessee	Active	
**Beta Delta Lambda**	June 2, 1996	Oregon Coast Community College, Newport Campus	South Beach, Oregon	Oregon	Active	
**Beta Delta Mu**	June 4, 1996	Robeson Community College	Lumberton, North Carolina	North Carolina	Active	
**Beta Delta Nu**	June 10, 1996	Peninsula College	Port Angeles, Washington	Washington	Active	
**Beta Delta Omicron**	October 22, 1996	Tarrant County College, Southeast Campus	Arlington, Texas	Texas	Active	
**Beta Delta Pi**	January 12, 1997	Carteret Community College	Morehead City, North Carolina	North Carolina	Active	
**Beta Delta Rho**	August 9, 1996	Gadsden State Community College, Ayers Campus	Anniston, Alabama	Alabama	Active	
**Beta Delta Sigma**	April 11, 1997	Los Angeles Valley College, Van Nuys Campus	Valley Glen, Los Angeles, California	California	Active	
**Beta Delta Upsilon**	October 1, 1996	Kennebec Valley Community College, Fairfield Campus	Fairfield, Maine	Maine	Active	
**Beta Delta Phi**	November 7, 1996	Black River Technical College	Pocahontas, Arkansas	Arkansas	Active	
**Beta Delta Chi**	November 4, 1996	Cabarrus College of Health Sciences	Concord, North Carolina	North Carolina	Active	
**Beta Delta Psi**	December 6, 1996	Des Moines Area Community College, Urban Campus	Des Moines, Iowa	Iowa	Active	
**Beta Delta Omega**	November 10, 1996	Mt. San Jacinto College	Menifee, California	California	Active	
**Beta Epsilon Alpha**	October 15, 1996	Georgia Military College, Valdosta Campus	Valdosta, Georgia	Georgia	Active	
**Beta Epsilon Beta**	December 13, 1996	Saddleback College	Mission Viejo, California	California	Active	
**Beta Epsilon Gamma**	November 21, 1996	Portland Community College, Cascade Campus	North Portland, Oregon	Oregon	Active	
**Beta Epsilon Zeta**	May 15, 1997	Community Colleges of Spokane, Colville Center	Colville, Washington	Washington	Active	
**Beta Epsilon Eta**	January 25, 1997	Des Moines Area Community College, Ankeny Campus	Ankeny, Iowa	Iowa	Active	
**Beta Epsilon Iota**	February 12, 1997	Spokane Community College	Spokane, Washington	Washington	Active	
**Beta Epsilon Lambda**	April 5, 1997	Kodiak College	Kodiak, Alaska	Alaska	Active	
**Beta Epsilon Mu**	March 24, 1997	South Texas College, Pecan Campus	McAllen, Texas	Texas	Active	
**Beta Epsilon Nu**	May 8, 1997	San Jose City College	San Jose, California	California	Active	
**Beta Epsilon Omicron**	May 20, 1997	Fox Valley Technical College, Appleton Campus	Appleton, Wisconsin	Wisconsin	Active	
**Beta Epsilon Pi**	March 13, 1997	Northeast Iowa Community College, Peosta Campus	Peosto, Iowa	Iowa	Active	
**Beta Epsilon Tau**	April 24, 1997	Colorado Northwestern Community College, Rangely Campus	Rangely, Colorado	Colorado	Active	
**Beta Epsilon Upsilon**	April 6, 1997	Pennsylvania College of Technology	Williamsport, Pennsylvania	Pennsylvania	Active	
**Beta Epsilon Chi**	May 16, 1997	James Sprunt Community College	Kenansville, North Carolina	North Carolina	Active	
**Beta Epsilon Phi**	May 1, 1997	Northeast Iowa Community College, Calmar Campus	Calmar, Iowa	Iowa	Active	
**Beta Epsilon Omega**	May 2, 1997	Pennsylvania Highlands Community College, Richland Campus	Johnstown, Pennsylvania	Pennsylvania	Active	
**Beta Zeta Alpha**	May 10, 1997	Georgia Military College, Fairburn Campus	Fairburn, Georgia	Georgia	Active	
**Beta Zeta Beta**	May 2, 1997	Trinity College of Nursing and Health Sciences	Rock Island, Illinois	Illinois	Active	
**Beta Zeta Gamma**	November 23, 1997	East Arkansas Community College	Forrest City, Arkansas	Arkansas	Active	
**Beta Zeta Delta**	May 4, 1997	New River Community and Technical College, Greenbrier Valley Campus	Lewisburg, West Virginia	West Virginia	Active	
**Beta Zeta Epsilon**	May 6, 1997	Scott Community College	Riverdale, Iowa	Iowa	Active	
**Beta Zeta Zeta**	May 9, 1997	University of New Mexico–Valencia	Rio Communities North, New Mexico	New Mexico	Active	
**Beta Zeta Theta**	June 22, 1997	Johnston Community College	Smithfield, North Carolina	North Carolina	Active	
**Beta Zeta Kappa**	May 18, 1997	Ivy Tech Community College, Warsaw Site	Warsaw, Indiana	Indiana	Active	
**Beta Zeta Lambda**	July 18, 1997	McDowell Technical Community College	Marion, North Carolina	North Carolina	Active	
**Beta Zeta Mu**	December 1, 1997	Western Iowa Tech Community College	Sioux City, Iowa	Iowa	Active	
**Beta Zeta Nu**	October 25, 1997	Cañada College	Redwood City, California	California	Active	
**Beta Zeta Pi**	September 25, 1997	American River College	Sacramento, California	California	Active	
**Beta Zeta Rho**	November 18, 1997	Vincennes University, Jasper Campus	Jasper, Indiana	Indiana	Active	
**Beta Zeta Sigma**	November 18, 1997	Carolinas College of Health Sciences	Charlotte, North Carolina	North Carolina	Active	
**Beta Zeta Upsilon**	December 13, 1997	Tidewater Community College, Norfolk Campus	Norfolk, Virginia	Virginia	Active	
**Beta Zeta Phi**	January 22, 1998	Muscatine Community College	Muscatine, Iowa	Iowa	Active	
**Beta Zeta Chi**	December 7, 1997	University of New Mexico–Los Alamos	Los Alamos, New Mexico	New Mexico	Active	
**Beta Zeta Psi**	April 18, 1998	Texas State Technical College, Abilene Campus	Abilene, Texas	Texas	Active	
**Beta Zeta Omega**	February 28, 1998	University of Arkansas – Pulaski Technical College	North Little Rock, Arkansas	Arkansas	Active	
**Beta Eta Alpha**	December 7, 1997	Southeastern Community College	West Burlington, Iowa	Iowa	Active	
**Beta Eta Beta**	May 12, 1998	West Los Angeles College	Culver City, California	California	Active	
**Beta Eta Gamma**	March 8, 1998	Lamar Community College	Lamar, Colorado	Colorado	Active	
**Beta Eta Delta**	February 27, 1998	Catawba Valley Community College	Hickory, North Carolina	North Carolina	Active	
**Beta Eta Epsilon**	April 7, 1998	Missoula College	Missoula, Montana	Montana	Active	
**Beta Eta Theta**	April 19, 1998	Northwest Mississippi Community College, Lafayette-Yalobusha Technical Center	Oxford, Mississippi	Mississippi	Active	
**Beta Eta Zeta**	April 27, 1998	Iowa Lakes Community College	Estherville, Iowa	Iowa	Active	
**Beta Eta Iota**	March 27, 1998	New Mexico State University	Grants, New Mexico	New Mexico	Active	
**Beta Eta Kappa**	May 8, 1998	Perimeter College at Georgia State University, Newton Campus	Covington, Georgia	Georgia	Active	
**Beta Eta Lambda**	April 21, 1998	Brunswick Community College, Supply Center	Supply, North Carolina	North Carolina	Active	
**Beta Eta Mu**	April 19, 1998	Northern Oklahoma College, Enid Campus	Enid, Oklahoma	Oklahoma	Active	
**Beta Eta Nu**	April 29, 1998	Southwestern Community College	Creston, Iowa	Iowa	Active	
**Beta Eta Xi**	May 3, 1998	Cloud County Community College, Geary County Campus	Junction City, Kansas	Kansas	Active	
**Beta Eta Omicron**	May 6, 1998	Great Falls College Montana State University	Great Falls, Montana	Montana	Active	
**Beta Eta Pi**	May 14, 1998	Central Carolina Technical College	Sumter, South Carolina	South Carolina	Active	
**Beta Eta Rho**	October 8, 1998	Santiago Canyon College	Orange, California	California	Active	
**Beta Eta Sigma**	November 6, 1998	University of Arkansas Community College at Morrilton	Morrilton, Arkansas	Arkansas	Active	
**Beta Eta Tau**	November 11, 1998	Mohave Community College, North Mohave Campus	Colorado City, Arizona	Arizona	Active	
**Beta Eta Upsilon**	November 20, 1998	University of Arkansas Rich Mountain	Mena, Arkansas	Arkansas	Active	
**Beta Eta Phi**	January 22, 1999	Bristol Community College	Fall River, Massachusetts	Massachusetts	Active	
**Beta Eta Chi**	December 10, 1998	Ridgewater College, Hutchinson Campus	Hutchinson, Minnesota	Minnesota	Active	
**Beta Eta Psi**	December 7, 1998	Sacramento City College	Sacramento, California	California	Active	
**Beta Eta Omega**	December 5, 1998	Mesalands Community College	Tucumcari, New Mexico	New Mexico	Active	
**Beta Theta Alpha**	December 11, 1998	Keiser University, Melbourne Campus	Fort Lauderdale, Florida	Florida	Active	
**Beta Theta Beta**	January 19, 1999	Northwest Indian College	Bellingham, Washington,	Washington	Active	
**Beta Theta Gamma**	April 15, 1999	Miles Community College	Miles City, Montana	Montana	Active	
**Beta Theta Zeta**	April 18, 1999	Sampson Community College	Clinton, North Carolina	North Carolina	Active	
**Beta Theta Eta**	April 25, 1999	North Central State College	Mansfield, Ohio	Ohio	Active	
**Beta Theta Theta**	April 18, 1999	Flathead Valley Community College, Lincoln County Campus	Libby, Montana	Montana	Active	
**Beta Theta Iota**	April 23, 1999	Western Nevada College, Fallon Campus	Fallon, Nevada	Nevada	Active	
**Beta Theta Kappa**	May 14, 1999	Butte College, Oroville Campus	Oroville, California	California	Active	
**Beta Theta Lambda**	April 23, 1999	Merritt College	Oakland, California	California	Active	
**Beta Theta Mu**	June 4, 1999	Belmont College	St. Clairsville, Ohio	Ohio	Active	
**Beta Theta Xi**	February 28, 2001	Des Moines Area Community College, Carroll Campus	Carroll, Iowa	Iowa	Active	
**Beta Theta Omicron**	January 20, 1999	Skyline College	San Bruno, California	California	Active	
**Beta Theta Pi**	November 14, 1999	North Country Community College	Saranac Lake, New York	New York	Active	
**Beta Theta Rho**	January 1, 1999	Randolph Community College	Asheboro, North Carolina	North Carolina	Active	
**Beta Theta Tau**	December 10, 1999	Dakota County Technical College	Rosemount, Minnesota	Minnesota	Active	
**Beta Theta Upsilon**	December 2, 1999	Cosumnes River College	Sacramento, California	California	Active	
**Beta Theta Phi**	December 3, 1999	West Georgia Technical College, Carrollton Campus	Carrollton, Georgia	Georgia	Active	
**Beta Theta Chi**	December 9, 1999	Grossmont College	El Cajon, California	California	Active	
**Beta Theta Psi**	January 29, 2000	Nunez Community College	Chalmette, Louisiana	Louisiana	Active	
**Beta Theta Omega**	March 24, 2000	St. Petersburg College, Seminole Campus	Seminole, Florida	Florida	Active	
**Beta Iota Beta**	March 12, 2000	East Georgia State College	Swainsboro, Georgia	Georgia	Active	
**Beta Iota Gamma**	April 13, 2000	Southwestern Oklahoma State University, Sayre Campus	Sayre, Oklahoma	Oklahoma	Active	
**Beta Iota Delta**	March 31, 2000	Colorado Mountain College, Leadville Campus	Leadville, Colorado	Colorado	Active	
**Beta Iota Epsilon**	April 9, 2000	Arkansas State University–Mountain Home	Mountain Home, Arkansas	Arkansas	Active	
**Beta Iota Zeta**	May 18, 2000	East Mississippi Community College, Golden Triangle Campus	Mayhew, Mississippi	Mississippi	Active	
**Beta Iota Eta**	May 21, 2000	Texas State Technical College, Breckenridge Campus	Breckenridge, Texas	Texas	Active	
**Beta Iota Iota**	June 11, 2000	Southwestern Illinois College, Red Bud Campus	Red Bud, Illinois	Illinois	Active	
**Beta Iota Theta**	June 1, 2000	Fashion Institute of Design & Merchandising	Los Angeles, California	California	Active	
**Beta Iota Kappa**	October 13, 2000	San Diego City College	San Diego, California	California	Active	
**Beta Iota Lambda**	November 4, 2000	San Diego Miramar College	San Diego, California	California	Active	
**Beta Iota Nu**	September 24, 2000	ECPI University, Newport News Campus	Newport News, Virginia	Virginia	Active	
**Beta Iota Omicron**	December 6, 2000	Keiser University, Tallahassee Campus	Tallahassee, Florida	Florida	Active	
**Beta Iota Pi**	December 8, 2000	Cleveland Community College, Shelby Campus	Shelby, North Carolina	North Carolina	Active	
**Beta Iota Rho**	December 12, 2000	Luzerne County Community College	Nanticoke, Pennsylvania	Pennsylvania	Active	
**Beta Iota Sigma**	December 4, 2000	Front Range Community College, Boulder County Campus	Longmont, Colorado	Colorado	Active	
**Beta Iota Tau**	March 2, 2001	Lake Washington Institute of Technology	Kirkland, Washington	Washington	Active	
**Beta Iota Phi**	May 18, 2001	Texas State Technical College, Harlingen Campus	Harlingen, Texas	Texas	Active	
**Beta Iota Chi**	April 19, 2001	Texas State Technical College, Brownwood Campus	Brownwood, Texas	Texas	Active	
**Beta Iota Omega**	May 7, 2001	Washington County Community College, Calais Campus	Calais, Maine	Maine	Active	
**Beta Kappa Alpha**	May 17, 2001	Lackawanna College	Scranton, Pennsylvania	Pennsylvania	Active	
**Beta Kappa Delta**	May 31, 2001	Santa Monica College	Santa Monica, California	California	Active	
**Beta Kappa Epsilon**	June 22, 2001	University of Maryland Global Campus Europe	APO/FPO Europe, Middle East, Africa, and Canada		Active	
**Beta Kappa Zeta**	November 2, 2001	ECPI University, Greenville Campus	Greenville, South Carolina	South Carolina	Active	
**Beta Kappa Eta**	October 15, 2001	University of Wisconsin–Platteville Baraboo/Sauk County	Baraboo, Wisconsin	Wisconsin	Active	
**Beta Kappa Iota**	December 3, 2001	Miami Dade College, Eduardo J. Padrón Campus	Miami, Florida	Florida	Active	
**Beta Kappa Theta**	October 28, 2001	Columbia State Community College	Columbia, Tennessee	Tennessee	Active	
**Beta Kappa Lambda**	November 16, 2001	Aims Community College, Greeley Campus	Greeley, Colorado	Colorado	Active	
**Beta Kappa Mu**	November 30, 2001	Trinidad State College, Valley Campus	Alamosa, Colorado	Colorado	Active	
**Beta Kappa Xi**	April 30, 2004	Hennepin Technical College, Brooklyn Park Campus	Brooklyn Park, Minnesota	Minnesota	Active	
**Beta Kappa Pi**	May 24, 2002	Chaffey College	Rancho Cucamonga, California	California	Active	
**Beta Kappa Rho**	May 2, 2002	Pine Technical and Community College	Pine City, Minnesota	Minnesota	Active	
**Beta Kappa Tau**	May 7, 2002	Fullerton College	Fullerton, California	California	Active	
**Beta Kappa Upsilon**	July 13, 2002	ECPI University, Northern Virginia Campus	Manassas, Virginia	Virginia	Active	
**Beta Kappa Chi**	May 5, 2006	Cerro Coso Community College	Ridgecrest, California	California	Active	
**Beta Kappa Psi**	October 3, 2002	Northwest Arkansas Community College	Bentonville, Arkansas	Arkansas	Active	
**Beta Kappa Omega**	April 21, 1960	Montgomery College, Germantown Campus	Germantown, Maryland	Maryland	Active	
**Beta Lambda Alpha**	April 21, 1960	Montgomery College, Rockville Campus	Rockville, Maryland	Maryland	Active	
**Beta Lambda Beta**	June 25, 2002	Bellingham Technical College	Bellingham, Washington	Washington	Active	
**Beta Lambda Gamma**	November 22, 2002	Southwest Texas Junior College, Eagle Pass Campus	Eagle Pass, Texas	Texas	Active	
**Beta Lambda Delta**	July 14, 2002	Jefferson State Community College, Shelby-Hoover Campus	Hoover, Alabama	Alabama	Active	
**Beta Lambda Epsilon**	May 22, 2003	Norco College	Norco, California	California	Active	
**Beta Lambda Zeta**	November 16, 2002	Taft College	Taft, California	California	Active	
**Beta Lambda Theta**	October 25, 2002	Klamath Community College	Klamath Falls, Oregon	Oregon	Active	
**Beta Lambda Kappa**	August 13, 2002	Macomb Community College, Center Campus	Clinton Township, Michigan	Michigan	Active	
**Beta Lambda Lambda**	April 15, 2003	Cascadia College	Bothell, Washington	Washington	Active	
**Beta Lambda Mu**	December 2, 2002	Lone Star College–CyFair	Cypress, Texas	Texas	Active	
**Beta Lambda Nu**	March 9, 2003	Hocking College, Perry Campus	New Lexington, Ohio	Ohio	Active	
**Beta Lambda Xi**	April 11, 2003	Dunwoody College of Technology	Minneapolis, Minnesota	Minnesota	Active	
**Beta Lambda Omicron**	March 2, 2003	Georgia Military College, Augusta Campus	Martinez, Georgia	Georgia	Active	
**Beta Lambda Pi**	December 11, 2002	Northwest Iowa Community College	Sheldon, Iowa	Iowa	Active	
**Beta Lambda Rho**	May 1, 2003	York County Community College	Wells, Maine	Maine	Active	
**Beta Lambda Sigma**	April 10, 2003	Lakeshore Technical College	Cleveland, Wisconsin	Wisconsin	Active	
**Beta Lambda Tau**	April 22, 2003	Kirkwood Community College, Coralville Campus	Coralville, Iowa	Iowa	Active	
**Beta Lambda Upsilon**	May 6, 2003	Northwest Vista College	San Antonio, Texas	Texas	Active	
**Beta Lambda Chi**	April 23, 2004	Barstow Community College	Barstow, California	California	Active	
**Beta Lambda Psi**	April 12, 2003	Northern Marianas College, Saipan Campus	Saipan, Northern Mariana Islands	Northern Mariana Islands	Active	
**Beta Mu Alpha**	March 18, 2003	Orange Coast College	Costa Mesa, California	California	Active	
**Beta Mu Beta**	May 19, 2003	University of Arkansas Community College at Batesville	Batesville, Arkansas	Arkansas	Active	
**Beta Mu Gamma**	May 21, 2003	Solano Community College	Fairfield, California	California	Active	
**Beta Mu Epsilon**	June 11, 2003	Keiser University, Lakeland Campus	Lakeland, Florida	Florida	Active	
**Beta Mu Zeta**	May 19, 2004	Sierra College	Rocklin, California	California	Active	
**Beta Mu Eta**	May 12, 2003	South Central College, North Mankato Campus	North Mankato, Minnesota	Minnesota	Active	
**Beta Mu Theta**	December 5, 2003	Modesto Junior College	Modesto, California	California	Active	
**Beta Mu Iota**	December 12, 2003	Metropolitan College of New York, Bronx Center	New York City, New York	New York	Active	
**Beta Mu Kappa**	March 9, 2004	Moraine Park Technical College	Fond du Lac, Wisconsin	Wisconsin	Active	
**Beta Mu Mu**	March 19, 2004	Shasta College	Redding, California	California	Active	
**Beta Mu Nu**	December 8, 2003	Luna Community College	Las Vegas, New Mexico	New Mexico	Active	
**Beta Mu Xi**	December 11, 2004	Hartnell College	Salinas, California	California	Active	
**Beta Mu Omicron**	April 8, 2004	Baton Rouge Community College, Mid City Campus	Baton Rouge, Louisiana	Louisiana	Active	
**Beta Mu Rho**	April 22, 2004	North Dakota State College of Science	Wahpeton, North Dakota	North Dakota	Active	
**Beta Mu Tau**	December 1, 2003	Des Moines Area Community College, West Campus	West Des Moines, Iowa	Iowa	Active	
**Beta Mu Upsilon**	May 1, 2004	Folsom Lake College	Folsom, California	California	Active	
**Beta Mu Phi**	November 16, 2004	Indian Hills Community College, Ottumwa Campus	Ottumwa, Iowa	Iowa	Active	
**Beta Mu Chi**	April 29, 2004	University of Wisconsin–Whitewater, Rock County Campus	Janesville, Wisconsin	Wisconsin	Active	
**Beta Nu Alpha**	April 15, 2004	Aaniiih Nakoda College	Harlem, Montana	Montana	Active	
**Beta Nu Gamma**	May 3, 2004	Arkansas State University-Newport	Newport, Arkansas	Arkansas	Active	
**Beta Nu Delta**	April 22, 2004	Thaddeus Stevens College of Technology	Lancaster, Pennsylvania	Pennsylvania	Active	
**Beta Nu Epsilon**	December 10, 2004	East Los Angeles College	Monterey Park, California	California	Active	
**Beta Nu Eta**	May 12, 2004	Citrus College	Glendora, California	California	Active	
**Beta Nu Theta**	September 30, 2005	Northeast Wisconsin Technical College	Green Bay, Wisconsin	Wisconsin	Active	
**Beta Nu Iota**	December 12, 2004	Neosho County Community College	Ottawa, Kansas	Kansas	Active	
**Beta Nu Kappa**	October 25, 2004	Northland Community & Technical College	East Grand Forks, Minnesota	Minnesota	Active	
**Beta Nu Lambda**	March 24, 2005	Eastern West Virginia Community and Technical College	Moorefield, West Virginia	West Virginia	Active	
**Beta Nu Mu**	April 26, 2006	Roanoke–Chowan Community College	Ahoskie, North Carolina	North Carolina	Active	
**Beta Nu Omicron**	December 2, 2004	Anoka Technical College	Anoka, Minnesota	Minnesota	Active	
**Beta Nu Pi**	March 5, 2005	Marion Technical College	Marion, Ohio	Ohio	Active	
**Beta Nu Rho**	December 13, 2006	Barton Community College, Fort Riley Campus	Fort Riley, Kansas	Kansas	Active	
**Beta Nu Sigma**	April 29, 2005	Richmond Community College	Hamlet, North Carolina	North Carolina	Active	
**Beta Nu Tau**	February 28, 2005	Northwest Technical College	Bemidji, Minnesota	Minnesota	Active	
**Beta Nu Upsilon**	March 17, 2005	Pitt Community College	Winterville, North Carolina	North Carolina	Active	
**Beta Nu Phi**	April 7, 2005	University of Rio Grande	Rio Grande, Ohio	Ohio	Active	
**Beta Nu Chi**	March 29, 2005	Western Technical College	La Crosse, Wisconsin	Wisconsin	Active	
**Beta Nu Psi**	May 6, 2005	Northern Virginia Community College, Medical Education Campus	Springfield, Virginia	Virginia	Active	
**Beta Nu Omega**	November 14, 2005	Highland Community College, Wamego Center	Wamego, Kansas	Kansas	Active	
**Beta Xi Alpha**	April 7, 2005	Saint Paul College	Saint Paul, Minnesota	Minnesota	Active	
**Beta Xi Beta**	September 10, 2005	Keiser University, Orlando Campus	Orlando, Florida	Florida	Active	
**Beta Xi Gamma**	March 15, 2006	St. Cloud Technical and Community College	St. Cloud, Minnesota	Minnesota	Active	
**Beta Xi Delta**	April 24, 2005	Columbia College	Sonora, California	California	Active	
**Beta Xi Epsilon**	June 29, 2005	ECPI University, Raleigh Campus	Raleigh, North Carolina	North Carolina	Active	
**Beta Xi Eta**	November 18, 2005	College of San Mateo	San Mateo, California	California	Active	
**Beta Xi Theta**	July 23, 2005	Keiser University, Miami Campus	Miami, Florida	Florida	Active	
**Beta Xi Mu**	January 8, 2006	River Parishes Community College	Gonzales, Louisiana.	Louisiana	Active	(Note: Chapter formed at the Sorrento Campus. However, the college moved to Gonzales, Louisiana in 2014.)
**Beta Xi Xi**	November 22, 2005	Muskegon Community College	Muskegon, Michigan	Michigan	Active	
**Beta Xi Omicron**	December 13, 2005	Montgomery Community College	Troy, North Carolina	North Carolina	Active	
**Beta Xi Pi**	May 3, 2006	Keiser University, Fort Lauderdale Campus	Fort Lauderdale, Florida	Florida	Active	
**Beta Xi Sigma**	February 27, 2006	Highlands College of Montana Tech	Butte, Montana	Montana	Active	
**Beta Xi Tau**	March 28, 2006	Savannah Technical College	Savannah, Georgia	Georgia	Active	
**Beta Xi Upsilon**	January 31, 2006	Keiser University, Sarasota Campus	Lakewood Ranch, Florida	Florida	Active	
**Beta Xi Phi**	February 16, 2006	New England Institute of Technology, Warwick Campus	East Greenwich, Rhode Island	Rhode Island	Active	
**Beta Xi Chi**	November 4, 2005	Owens Community College, Findlay Campus	Findlay, Ohio	Ohio	Active	
**Beta Xi Psi**	January 26, 2006	Copiah–Lincoln Community College, Simpson County Center	Mendenhall, Mississippi	Mississippi	Active	
**Beta Xi Omega**	April 26, 2006	South Louisiana Community College	Lafayette, Louisiana	Louisiana	Active	
Beta Omicron Alpha	April 7, 2006	St. Vincent's College at Sacred Heart University	Bridgeport, Connecticut	Connecticut	Inactive	(Note: Chapter formed at St. Vincent's College which merged with Sacred Heart University in 2017, forming St Vincent's College at Sacred Heart University. The campus was closed in 2024.)
**Beta Omicron Beta**	November 19, 2005	Southwestern Christian College, Terrell Campus	Terrell, Texas	Texas	Active	
**Beta Omicron Gamma**	December 1, 2006	Clover Park Technical College	Lakewood, Washington	Washington	Active	
**Beta Omicron Delta**	March 19, 2006	Blue Ridge Community and Technical College	Martinsburg, West Virginia	West Virginia	Active	
**Beta Omicron Epsilon**	May 20, 2006	ECPI University, Charleston Campus	North Charleston, South Carolina	South Carolina	Active	
**Beta Omicron Zeta**	March 22, 2006	Palau Community College	Koror, Palau		Active	
**Beta Omicron Theta**	January 31, 2006	Keiser University, Daytona Beach Campus	Daytona Beach, Florida	Florida	Active	
**Beta Omicron Iota**	February 1, 2006	Keiser University, Jacksonville Campus	Jacksonville, Florida	Florida	Active	
**Beta Omicron Kappa**	January 30, 2006	Keiser University, Pembroke Pines Campus	Pembroke Pines, Florida	Florida	Active	
**Beta Omicron Mu**	March 28, 2007	Keiser University, Tampa Campus	Tampa, Florida	Florida	Active	
**Beta Omicron Nu**	January 31, 2006	Keiser University, West Palm Beach Campus	West Palm Beach, Florida	Florida	Active	
**Beta Omicron Xi**	May 19, 2006	Lassen Community College	Susanville, California	California	Active	
**Beta Omicron Omicron**	December 6, 2006	Brightpoint Community College, Midlothian Campus	Midlothian, Virginia	Virginia	Active	
**Beta Omicron Pi**	March 17, 2006	Colorado Mountain College, Rifle Campus	Rifle, Colorado	Colorado	Active	
**Beta Omicron Sigma**	May 28, 2006	H. Lavity Stoutt Community College, Paraquita Bay Campus	Road Town, Tortola, British Virgin Islands		Active	
**Beta Omicron Upsilon**	October 20, 2006	College of Micronesia, National Campus	Palikir, Pohnpei, Federated States of Micronesia		Active	
**Beta Omicron Phi**	October 7, 2007	East Central College, Rolla Campus	Rolla, Missouri	Missouri	Active	
**Beta Omicron Chi**	March 15, 2007	Yuba College, Marysville Campus	Yuba City, California	California	Active	
**Beta Omicron Omega**	February 2, 2007	Helena College University of Montana	Helena, Montana	Montana	Active	
**Beta Pi Beta**	November 10, 2006	Metropolitan Community College, South Omaha Campus	Omaha, Nebraska	Nebraska	Active	
**Beta Pi Gamma**	September 7, 2006	College of Westchester	White Plains, New York	New York	Active	
**Beta Pi Zeta**	April 13, 2007	ECPI University, Greensboro Campus	Greensboro, North Carolina	North Carolina	Active	
**Beta Pi Theta**	March 8, 2007	Miami Dade College, Hialeah Campus	Hialeah, Florida	Florida	Active	
**Beta Pi Iota**	May 24, 2007	Diablo Valley College, San Ramon Campus	San Ramon, California	California	Active	
**Beta Pi Kappa**	December 12, 2008	Los Angeles City College	Los Angeles, California	California	Active	
**Beta Pi Mu**	March 8, 2008	Mount Saint Mary's University, Los Angeles	Los Angeles, California	California	Active	
**Beta Pi Nu**	January 29, 2007	Lurleen B. Wallace Community College, Greenville Campus	Greenville, Alabama	Alabama	Active	
**Beta Pi Xi**	January 27, 2008	Mercy College of Ohio, Toledo Campus	Toledo, Ohio	Ohio	Active	
**Beta Pi Rho**	November 17, 2007	Portland Community College, Southeast Campus	Portland, Oregon	Oregon	Active	
**Beta Pi Sigma**	June 18, 2008	Eastern New Mexico University, Ruidoso Campus	Ruidoso, New Mexico	New Mexico	Active	
**Beta Pi Tau**	April 11, 2008	Gateway Community and Technical College, Boone Campus	Florence, Kentucky	Kentucky	Active	
**Beta Pi Upsilon**	April 16, 2008	Lake Region State College	Devils Lake, North Dakota	North Dakota	Active	
**Beta Pi Chi**	July 22, 2008	Sullivan University, Lexington Campus	Lexington, Kentucky	Kentucky	Active	
**Beta Pi Omega**	May 15, 2009	Los Angeles Southwest College	West Athens, California	California	Active	
**Beta Rho Alpha**	April 20, 2008	Northern Oklahoma College, Stillwater Campus	Stillwater, Oklahoma	Oklahoma	Active	
**Beta Rho Beta**	April 30, 2008	Southwest Technical College, Fennimore Campus	Fennimore, Wisconsin	Wisconsin	Active	
**Beta Rho Gamma**	March 13, 2008	ECPI University, Columbia Campus	Columbia, South Carolina	South Carolina	Active	
**Beta Rho Epsilon**	March 12, 2009	St. Louis Community College–Wildwood	Wildwood, Missouri	Missouri	Active	
**Beta Rho Zeta**	June 2, 2008	Northcentral Technical College	Wausau, Wisconsin	Wisconsin	Active	
**Beta Rho Iota**	October 14, 2008	College of the Desert	Palm Desert, California	California	Inactive	
**Beta Rho Eta**	April 23, 2009	Dakota College at Bottineau	Bottineau, North Dakota	North Dakota	Active	
**Beta Rho Theta**	October 6, 2008	Bladen Community College	Dublin, North Carolina	North Carolina	Active	
**Beta Rho Kappa**	January 20, 2009	Maria College	Albany, New York	New York	Active	
**Beta Rho Lambda**	December 4, 2008	Fort Scott Community College, Miami County Campus	Fort Scott, Kansas	Kansas	Active	
**Beta Rho Mu**	April 13, 2009	Minnesota State College Southeast, Winona Campus	Winona, Minnesota	Minnesota	Active	
**Beta Rho Omicron**	December 2, 2008	Mississippi Delta Community College, Greenville Higher Education Center	Greenville, Mississippi	Mississippi	Active	
**Beta Rho Pi**	April 3, 2009	Copper Mountain College	Joshua Tree, California	California	Inactive	
**Beta Rho Rho**	May 14, 2009	Gwinnett Technical College	Lawrenceville, Georgia	Georgia	Active	
**Beta Rho Sigma**	July 16, 2009	ECPI University, Charlotte Campus	Charlotte, North Carolina	North Carolina	Active	
**Beta Rho Tau**	October 21, 2009	Oxnard College	Oxnard, California	California	Active	
**Beta Rho Phi**	October 17, 2011	Louisiana Delta Community College	Monroe, Louisiana	Louisiana	Active	
**Beta Rho Psi**	November 12, 2009	Blackhawk Technical College, Janesville Campus	Janesville, Wisconsin	Wisconsin	Active	
**Beta Rho Omega**	October 21, 2009	Chippewa Valley Technical College, Clairemont Campus	Eau Claire, Wisconsin	Wisconsin	Active	
**Beta Sigma Alpha**	March 28, 2009	Hillsborough Community College, Southshore Campus	Ruskin, Florida	Florida	Active	
**Beta Sigma Delta**	November 5, 2009	Northeast Lakeview College	Universal City, Texas	Texas	Active	
**Beta Sigma Theta**	September 23, 2010	Aultman College	Canton, Ohio	Ohio	Active	
**Beta Sigma Kappa**	November 29, 2011	SoutheastHEALTH College of Nursing and Health Sciences	Cape Girardeau, Missouri	Missouri	Active	
**Beta Sigma Lambda**	May 18, 2010	Northern Essex Community College, Haverhill Campus	Haverhill, Massachusetts	Massachusetts	Active	
**Beta Sigma Mu**	April 3, 2010	Tarrant County College, Trinity River Campus	Fort Worth, Texas	Texas	Active	
**Beta Sigma Nu**	March 23, 2010	San Joaquin Valley College, Ontario Campus	Ontario, California	California	Active	
**Beta Sigma Omicron**	June 18, 2010	Hawaii Tokai International College, Honolulu Campus	Kapolei, Hawaii	Hawaii	Active	
**Beta Sigma Rho**	April 16, 2010	Moorpark College	Moorpark, California	California	Active	
**Beta Sigma Sigma**	August 13, 2010	Georgia Military College, Columbus Campus	Columbus, Georgia	Georgia	Active	
**Beta Sigma Upsilon**	December 14, 2010	University of the District of Columbia Community College	Washington, D.C.	District of Columbia	Active	
**Beta Sigma Phi**	November 4, 2010	Central Carolina Community College, Lee County Campus	Sanford, North Carolina	North Carolina	Active	
**Beta Sigma Chi**	December 3, 2010	Marshalltown Community College, Iowa Valley Grinnell Campus	Grinnell, Iowa	Iowa	Active	
**Beta Sigma Psi**	April 8, 2011	Spartanburg Community College	Spartanburg, South Carolina	South Carolina	Active	
**Beta Tau Alpha**		Long Beach City College, Liberal Arts Campus	Long Beach, California	California	Active	
**Beta Tau Beta**	March 6, 2011	Jefferson Community and Technical College, Carrollton Campus	Carrollton, Kentucky	Kentucky	Active	
**Beta Tau Gamma**	November 8, 2010	Pearl River Community College, Forrest County Center	Hattiesburg, Mississippi	Mississippi	Active	
**Beta Tau Delta**	April 22, 2011	University of Alaska Anchorage Community and Technical College	Anchorage, Alaska	Alaska	Active	
**Beta Tau Epsilon**	March 28, 2010	Jefferson Community and Technical College, Shelby County Campus	Shelbyville, Kentucky	Kentucky	Active	
**Beta Tau Theta**	February 26, 1991	Rowan–Cabarrus Community College	Salisbury, North Carolina	North Carolina	Active	
**Beta Tau Eta**	December 1, 2010	Mississippi Gulf Coast Community College, George County Center	Lucedale, Mississippi	Mississippi	Active	
**Beta Tau Zeta**	October 14, 2010	Pasco–Hernando State College, Spring Hill Campus	Spring Hill, Florida	Florida	Active	
**Beta Tau Iota**	April 17, 2011	Cayuga Community College, Fulton Campus	Fulton, New York	New York	Active	
**Beta Tau Kappa**	March 25, 2011	Metropolitan Community College, MCC Online Campus	Kansas City, Missouri	Missouri	Active	
**Beta Tau Lambda**	April 1, 2011	Montgomery County Community College, Pottstown Campus	Pottstown, Pennsylvania	Pennsylvania	Active	
**Beta Tau Mu**	April 30, 2011	Ohlone College	Fremont, California	California	Active	
**Beta Tau Pi**	April 22, 2011	Florida SouthWestern State College, Hendry/Glades Center	LaBelle, Florida	Florida	Active	
**Beta Tau Rho**	March 18, 2015	L. E. Fletcher Technical Community College	Schriever, Louisiana	Louisiana	Active	
**Beta Tau Sigma**	December 16, 1969	Itawamba Community College, Tupelo Campus	Tupelo, Mississippi	Mississippi	Active	
**Beta Tau Tau**	June 29, 2011	Keiser University, Fort Myers Campus	Fort Myers, Florida	Florida	Active	
**Beta Tau Phi**	October 28, 2011	Durham Technical Community College	Durham, North Carolina	North Carolina	Active	
**Beta Tau Chi**	March 13, 2012	University of Arizona Global Campus	Chandler, Arizona	Arizona	Active	
**Beta Tau Psi**	February 24, 2012	University of New Mexico–Gallup (UNM–Gallup)	Gallup, New Mexico	New Mexico	Active	
**Beta Tau Omega**	November 10, 2011	Broward College, Center For Global Education	Pembroke Pines, Florida	Florida	Active	
**Beta Upsilon Alpha**	March 22, 2012	Southcentral Kentucky Community and Technical College	Bowling Green, Kentucky	Kentucky	Active	
**Beta Upsilon Beta**	September 20, 2012	Cuyahoga Community College, Westshore Campus	Westlake, Ohio	Ohio	Active	
**Beta Upsilon Gamma**	December 15, 2017	Miami Dade College, West Campus	Doral, Florida	Florida	Active	
**Beta Upsilon Delta**	April 30, 2012	Nash Community College	Rocky Mount, North Carolina	North Carolina	Active	
**Beta Upsilon Epsilon**	July 24, 2012	Colorado Mountain College, Vail Valley at Edwards	Edwards, Colorado	Colorado	Active	
**Beta Upsilon Iota**	April 26, 2013	University of New Mexico–Taos (UNM–Taos)	Taos, New Mexico	New Mexico	Active	
**Beta Upsilon Nu**	April 16, 2013	Lone Star College–University Park	Houston, Texas	Texas	Active	
**Beta Upsilon Xi**	April 16, 2013	J.F. Drake State Community and Technical College	Huntsville, Alabama	Alabama	Active	
**Beta Upsilon Omicron**	February 14, 2013	Bates Technical College, Downtown Campus	Tacoma, Washington	Washington	Active	
**Beta Upsilon Pi**	February 25, 2014	Arkansas Tech University–Ozark Campus	Ozark, Arkansas	Arkansas	Active	
**Beta Upsilon Rho**	January 30, 2014	City College at Montana State University Billings	Billings, Montana	Montana	Active	
**Beta Upsilon Sigma**	November 20, 2013	Esperanza College of Eastern University, Philadelphia Campus	Philadelphia, Pennsylvania	Pennsylvania	Active	
**Beta Upsilon Upsilon**	August 4, 2013	Polk State College, Lakeland Campus	Lakeland, Florida	Florida	Active	
**Beta Upsilon Phi**	May 12, 2014	Coalinga College	Coalinga, California	California	Active	
**Beta Upsilon Chi**	August 28, 2013	Navarro College, Waxahachie Campus	Waxahachie, Texas	Texas	Active	
**Beta Upsilon Psi**	November 11, 2013	Strayer University	Washington, D.C.	District of Columbia	Active	
**Beta Upsilon Omega**	May 22, 2014	Chemeketa Community College, Yamhill Valley Campus	McMinnville, Oregon	Oregon	Active	
**Beta Phi Alpha**	June 6, 2014	Carrington College, San Leandro Campus	San Leandro, California	California	Active	
**Beta Chi Alpha**	May 4, 2017	Northwest Louisiana Technical Community College, Minden Campus	Minden, Louisiana	Louisiana	Active	
**Beta Chi Beta**	April 26, 2018	Central Louisiana Technical Community College, Alexandria Main Campus	Alexandria, Louisiana	Louisiana	Active	
**Beta Chi Gamma**	March 15, 2017	Keiser University, Flagship Campus	West Palm Beach, Florida	Florida	Active	
**Beta Chi Zeta**	May 4, 2017	Tarrant County College, TCC Connect Campus	Fort Worth, Texas	Texas	Active	
**Beta Chi Theta**	April 26, 2017	Mid-State Technical College, Wisconsin Rapids Campus	Wisconsin Rapids, Wisconsin	Wisconsin	Active	
**Beta Chi Kappa**	July 18, 2017	Imperial Valley College	Imperial, California	California	Active	
**Beta Chi Mu**	May 22, 2018	Williamson College of the Trades	Media, Pennsylvania	Pennsylvania	Active	
**Beta Chi Nu**	November 13, 2017	Dougherty Family College, University of St. Thomas	Minneapolis, Minnesota	Minnesota	Active	
**Beta Chi Xi**	October 9, 2018	Walla Walla Community College, North Campus	Walla Walla, Washington	Washington	Active	
**Beta Chi Omicron**	December 7, 2017	Southside College of Health Sciences, Professional Schools	Colonial Heights, Virginia	Virginia	Active	
**Beta Chi Pi**	July 26, 2018	Texas State Technical College, Fort Bend Campus	Rosenberg, Texas	Texas	Active	
**Beta Chi Tau**	June 6, 2018	Southeast Community College, Milford Campus	Milford, Nebraska	Nebraska	Active	
**Beta Chi Upsilon**	June 1, 2018	Bermuda College	Paget Parish, Bermuda		Active	
**Beta Chi Phi**	July 31, 2018	Texas State Technical College, North Texas Campus	Red Oak, Texas	Texas	Active	
**Beta Chi Chi**	August 10, 2018	Ivy Tech Community College of Indiana, Valparaiso Campus	Valparaiso, Indiana	Indiana	Active	
**Beta Chi Psi**	February 5, 2019	College of Eastern Idaho	Idaho Falls, Idaho	Idaho	Active	
**Beta Chi Omega**	September 21, 2018	Waipahu High School Early College	Waipahu, Hawaii	Hawaii	Active	
**Beta Psi Alpha**	October 9, 2020	Coastline College	Fountain Valley, California	California	Active	
**Beta Psi Gamma**	January 9, 2019	J. F. Ingram State Technical College, Frank Lee Instructional Site	Deatsville, Alabama	Alabama	Active	
**Beta Psi Delta**	March 11, 2020	Keiser University, Port St. Lucie Campus	Port St. Lucie, Florida	Florida	Active	
**Beta Psi Epsilon**	January 23, 2019	Iḷisaġvik College	Utqiagvik, Alaska	Alaska	Active	(Note: The college is located in Utqiagvik, formerly known as Barrow, Alaska.)
**Beta Psi Zeta**	February 6, 2019	Moneague College	Moneague, Saint Ann, Jamaica	Moneague, Saint Ann, Jamaica	Active	
**Beta Psi Lambda**	April 26, 2019	Keiser University, New Port Richey Campus	New Port Richey, Florida	Florida	Active	
**Beta Psi Mu**	September 7, 2021	Foothill College, Los Altos Hills Campus	Los Altos Hills, California	California	Active	
**Beta Psi Nu**	April 23, 2020	Tacoma Community College, Washington Corrections Center for Women	Gig Harbor, Washington	Washington	Active	
**Beta Psi Xi**	March 9, 2022	ECPI University, Virginia Beach Campus	Virginia Beach, Virginia	Virginia	Active	
**Beta Psi Omicron**	December 30, 2019	University of South Dakota, Sioux Falls	Sioux Falls, South Dakota	South Dakota	Active	(Note: Chapter formed at the Community College of Sioux Falls, now USD Sioux Falls.)
**Beta Psi Pi**	March 9, 2020	Delaware County Community College, Chester County Campus	Downingtown, Pennsylvania	Pennsylvania	Active	
**Beta Psi Tau**	April 29, 2021	Pasadena City College	Pasadena, California	California	Active	
**Beta Psi Upsilon**	February 12, 2021	Clinton Public High School	Clinton, Mississippi	Mississippi	Active	
**Beta Psi Phi**	February 22, 2021	Keiser University, Clearwater Campus	Clearwater, Florida	Florida	Active	
**Beta Psi Chi**	April 26, 2021	Potomac State College of West Virginia University	Keyser, West Virginia	West Virginia	Active	
**Beta Psi Psi**	September 14, 2021	Clovis Community College	Fresno, California	California	Active	
**Beta Psi Omega**	August 18, 2021	Keiser University Naples	Naples, Florida	Florida	Active	
**Beta Omega Alpha**	November 23, 2021	Arkansas State University-Beebe	Beebe, Arkansas	Arkansas	Active	
**Beta Omega Beta**	August 24, 2022	Mississippi Delta Community College, Parchman	Moorhead, Mississippi	Mississippi	Active	
**Beta Omega Gamma**	November 11, 2022	Contra Costa College	San Pablo, California	California	Active	
**Beta Omega Delta**	January 1, 2023	Northwood Technical College, Rice Lake Campus	Rice Lake, Wisconsin	Wisconsin	Active	
**Beta Omega Epsilon**	August 17, 2023	Ivy Tech Community College of Indiana, Hamilton County Campus	Noblesvlle, Indiana	Indiana	Active	
**Beta Omega Zeta**	October 10, 2023	Lone Star College, Houston North	Houston, Texas	Texas	Active	
**Beta Omega Eta**	July 25, 2023	Drake University	Des Moines, Iowa	Iowa	Active	
**Beta Omega Theta**	October 26, 2023	Palm Beach State College, Loxahatchee Groves Campus	Loxahatchee Groves, Florida	Florida	Active	
**Beta Omega Iota**	May 3, 2024	Georgia Military College, Madison Campus	Madison, Georgia	Georgia	Active	
**Beta Omega Kappa**	May 10, 2024	Golden West College, Huntington Beach Campus	Huntington Beach, California	California	Active	
**Beta Omega Mu**	July 1, 2024	Bryant & Stratton College, Richmond Campus	North Chesterfield, Virginia	Virginia	Active	
