= List of colleges and universities in Virginia =

This is a list of colleges and universities in the U.S. state of Virginia. The oldest college or university in Virginia is The College of William and Mary, founded in 1693. In 2010, the Virginia Tech Carilion School of Medicine became the newest. The largest institution is Liberty University, with over 143,000 students. The smallest is the graduate-only Institute for the Psychological Sciences.

The State Council of Higher Education for Virginia defines four categories of degree-granting institutions of postsecondary education: public institutions, established private institutions in good standing with a nationally recognized accrediting organization, private and out-of-state institutions requiring certification and institutions exempt from state oversight for religious reasons. Also exempt from certification are vocational institutions supervised by other state agencies, and institutions supervised by the federal government. All public institutions and most traditional private institutions are accredited by the Southern Association of Colleges and Schools Commission on Colleges (SACSCOC). Other state-certified private non-religious institutions are accredited by a national organization, though a few do not have any accreditation. Some small religious institutions do not have accreditation.

== Public and established private institutions ==
Name	Location(s)	Control	Carnegie Classification	Accreditation	Founded	Enrollment (fall 2024)
American National University	Multiple	Private (for profit)	Masters university	ACICS	1886	770
Appalachian College of Pharmacy	Oakwood	Private (not for profit)	Special focus	ACPE	2003	113
Appalachian School of Law	Grundy	Private (not for profit)	Special focus	ABA	1994	154
Averett University	Danville	Private (not for profit)	Masters university	SACS	1859	1,476
Batten University	Norfolk	Private (Methodist)	Baccalaureate college	SACS	1961	1,853
Blue Ridge Community College	Weyers Cave	Public (Virginia Community College System)	Associate/Baccalaureate college	SACS	1967	3,790
Bluefield University	Bluefield	Private (Baptist)	Baccalaureate college	SACS	1922	959
Bridgewater College	Bridgewater	Private (Brethren)	Associate/Baccalaureate college	SACS	1880	1,448
Brightpoint Community College	Chester	Public (Virginia Community College System)	Associate/Baccalaureate college	SACS	1967	9,380
Central Virginia Community College	Lynchburg	Public (Virginia Community College System)	Associate/Baccalaureate college	SACS	1966	3,481
Christendom College	Front Royal	Private (Catholic)	Uncategorized	SACS	1977	615
Christopher Newport University	Newport News	Public	Masters university	SACS	1960	4,454
College of William & Mary	Williamsburg	Public	Research university	SACS	1693	9,818
Danville Community College	Danville	Public (Virginia Community College System)	Junior college	SACS	1936	2,465
Divine Mercy University	Sterling	Private (Catholic)	Doctoral university	SACS	1999	463
Eastern Mennonite University	Harrisonburg	Private (Mennonite)	Baccalaureate college	SACS	1917	1,154
Eastern Shore Community College	Melfa	Public (Virginia Community College System)	Junior college	SACS	1971	859
Eastern Virginia Medical School	Norfolk	Private (not for profit)	Doctoral university	SACS	1973	1,216
ECPI University	Multiple	Private (for profit)	Baccalaureate college	SACS	1966	12,572
Emory & Henry University	Emory	Private (Methodist)	Baccalaureate college	SACS	1836	1,311
Ferrum College	Ferrum	Private (Methodist)	Baccalaureate college	SACS	1913	763
George Mason University	Fairfax	Public	Research university	SACS	1957	39,766
Germanna Community College	Locust Grove	Public (Virginia Community College System)	Junior college	SACS	1970	8,544
Hampden-Sydney College	Hampden Sydney	Private (not for profit)	Baccalaureate college	SACS	1775	946
Hampton University	Hampton	Private (not for profit)	Masters university	SACS	1868	4,244
Hollins University	Roanoke	Private (not for profit)	Baccalaureate college	SACS	1842	761
Institute for the Psychological Sciences	Arlington	Private (Catholic)	Doctoral university	SACS	1997	160
J. Sargeant Reynolds Community College	Richmond	Public (Virginia Community College System)	Associate/Baccalaureate college	SACS	1972	8,681
James Madison University	Harrisonburg	Public	Research university	SACS	1908	22,740
Jefferson College of Health Sciences	Roanoke	Private	Doctoral university	SACS	1982	Unknown
Laurel Ridge Community College	Middletown	Public (Virginia Community College System)	Associate/Baccalaureate college	SACS	1970	5,902
Liberty University	Lynchburg	Private (Baptist)	Research university	SACS	1971	104,327
Longwood University	Farmville	Public	Masters university	SACS	1839	4,612
Marine Corps University	Quantico	Public (United States Marine Corps)	Special focus	SACS	1989	269
Mary Baldwin University	Staunton	Private (Presbyterian)	Masters university	SACS	1842	1,772
Marymount University	Arlington	Private (Catholic)	Masters university	SACS	1950	4,060
Mountain Empire Community College	Big Stone Gap	Public (Virginia Community College System)	Junior college	SACS	1972	2,116
Mountain Gateway Community College	Clifton Forge	Public (Virginia Community College System)	Junior college	SACS	1964	989
New River Community College	Dublin	Public (Virginia Community College System)	Junior college	SACS	1959	4,254
Norfolk State University	Norfolk	Public	Masters university	SACS	1935	6,053
Northern Virginia Community College	Annandale	Public (Virginia Community College System)	Junior college	SACS	1964	56,457
Old Dominion University	Norfolk	Public	Research university	SACS	1930	23,743
Patrick Henry College	Purcellville	Private (not for profit)	Baccalaureate college	TRACS	2000	425
Patrick & Henry Community College	Martinsville	Public (Virginia Community College System)	Junior college	SACS	1962	1,908
Paul D. Camp Community College	Franklin	Public (Virginia Community College System)	Junior college	SACS	1970	1,219
Piedmont Virginia Community College	Charlottesville	Public (Virginia Community College System)	Junior college	SACS	1972	5,263
Radford University	Radford	Public	Masters university	SACS	1910	7,812
Randolph College	Lynchburg	Private (not for profit)	Baccalaureate college	SACS	1891	816
Randolph–Macon College	Ashland	Private (Methodist)	Baccalaureate college	SACS	1830	1,687
Rappahannock Community College	Glenns, Warsaw	Public (Virginia Community College System)	Junior college	SACS	1969	2,962
Regent University	Virginia Beach	Private (Christian)	Doctoral university	SACS	1977	10,657
Richard Bland College	Petersburg	Public (Junior college associated with the College of William and Mary)	Junior college	SACS	1960	2,788
Roanoke College	Salem	Private (Lutheran)	Baccalaureate college	SACS	1842	1,804
Sentara College of Health Sciences	Chesapeake	Private (not for profit)	Baccalaureate college	ABHES	1892	312
Shenandoah University	Winchester	Private (Methodist)	Masters university	SACS	1875	4,454
Southern Virginia University	Buena Vista	Private (not for profit)	Baccalaureate college	SACS	1867	936
Southside Virginia Community College	Alberta, Keysville	Public (Virginia Community College System)	Junior college	SACS	1970	3,306
Southwest Virginia Community College	Richlands	Public (Virginia Community College System)	Junior college	SACS	1968	2,364
Sweet Briar College	Sweet Briar	Private (not for profit)	Associate/Baccalaureate college	SACS	1901	444
Tidewater Community College	Chesapeake, Norfolk, Portsmouth, Virginia Beach	Public (Virginia Community College System)	Junior college	SACS	1968	16,884
Union Presbyterian Seminary	Richmond	Private (Presbyterian)	Special focus	ATS	1896	159
University of Lynchburg	Lynchburg	Private (Disciples)	Masters university	SACS	1903	2,316
University of Management and Technology	Arlington	Private (for profit)	Baccalaureate college	DETC	1998	979
University of Mary Washington	Fredericksburg	Public	Masters university	SACS	1908	3,826
University of the Potomac	Falls Church	Private (for profit)	Special focus	SACS	1989	551
University of Richmond	Richmond	Private (not for profit)	Baccalaureate college	SACS	1830	3,722
University of Virginia	Charlottesville	Public	Research university	SACS	1819	26,409
University of Virginia's College at Wise	Wise	Public (University of Virginia)	Baccalaureate college	SACS	1954	2,167
Virginia Commonwealth University	Richmond	Public	Research university	SACS	1838	28,464
Virginia Highlands Community College	Abingdon	Public (Virginia Community College System)	Junior college	SACS	1969	2,082
Virginia–Maryland Regional College of Veterinary Medicine	Blacksburg	Public (Jointly by Virginia Tech & University of Maryland)	Masters university	SACS	1978	480
Virginia Military Institute	Lexington	Public	Baccalaureate college	SACS	1839	1,527
Virginia Peninsula Community College	Hampton	Public (Virginia Community College System)	Junior college	SACS	1968	6,410
Virginia Polytechnic Institute and State University (Virginia Tech)	Blacksburg	Public	Research university	SACS	1872	38,857
Virginia State University	Petersburg	Public	Masters university	SACS	1882	5,605
Virginia Union University	Richmond	Private (Baptist)	Baccalaureate college	SACS	1865	1,646
Virginia University of Lynchburg	Lynchburg	Private (Christian)	Doctoral university	TRACS	1886	581
Virginia University of Science & Technology	McLean	Private (for profit)	Masters university	Unaccredited	2016	Unknown
Virginia Western Community College	Roanoke	Public (Virginia Community College System)	Junior college	SACS	1966	6,332
Washington and Lee University	Lexington	Private (not for profit)	Baccalaureate college	SACS	1749	2,241
Wytheville Community College	Wytheville	Public (Virginia Community College System)	Junior college	SACS	1963	2,107

== Private and out-of-state institutions ==
School	Location(s)	Control	Type	Accreditation	Founded	Enrollment
Advanced Technology Institute	Virginia Beach	Private (for profit)	Uncategorized	ACCSC	1992	415
American Digital University	Sterling	Private (for profit)	Uncategorized	none	Unknown	Unknown
Aviation Institute of Maintenance	Multiple	Private (for profit)	Associate's college	ACCSC	1969	542
Bethel College	Hampton	Private (not for profit)	Uncategorized	none	1887	76
Bon Secours Memorial College of Nursing	Richmond	Private (not for profit)	Uncategorized	ACICS	1961	626
Bryant & Stratton College	Multiple	Private (for profit)	Baccalaureate college	MSCHE	1854	1,717
Central Texas College	Fort Lee	Public	Associate's college	SACS	1965	16,073
Centura College	Multiple	Private (for profit)	Career College	ACCSC	1983	557
Chamberlain College of Nursing	Arlington	Private (for profit)	Special focus	HLC	1889	557
Columbia College	Fairfax	Private (for profit)	Associate's college	COE	1999	151
DeVry University	Multiple	Private (for profit)	Masters university	HLC	1931	19
Edward Via College of Osteopathic Medicine	Blacksburg	Private (not for profit)	Special focus	COCA	2002	2,617
Fortis College	Multiple	Private (for profit)	Associate's college	ACICS	2008	901
Georgetown University	Arlington	Private (not for profit)	Research university	MSCHE	1789	19,204
Global Health College	Alexandria	Private (for profit)	Associate's college	none	2004	
Johns Hopkins University	Arlington	Private (not for profit)	Research university	MSCHE	1876	26,152
Life Pacific University	Christiansburg	Private (Pentecostal)	Special focus	WASC-ACCJC	1923	
Missouri State University	Fairfax	Public	Masters university	HLC	1906	23,697
Reformed Theological Seminary	McLean	Private (Christian)	Faith-related institution	ATS	1966	Unknown
Saint Leo University	Multiple	Private (Catholic)	Masters university	SACS	1889	5,232
Saint Michael College of Allied Health	Alexandria	Private (for profit)	Uncategorized	none	1971	193
South University	Multiple	Private (for profit)	Baccalaureate college	SACS	1867	653
Southside Regional Medical Center Professional Schools	Petersburg	Private (for profit)	Uncategorized	JRCERT	1895	151
Strayer University	Multiple	Private (for profit)	Masters university	MSCHE	1892	1,998
University of Fairfax	Vienna	Private (not for profit)	Uncategorized	DETC	2002	Unknown
University of Maryland Global Campus, formerly UMUC	Fort Belvoir	Public	Research university	MSCHE	1807	Unknown
University of North America	Vienna	Private (for profit)	Uncategorized	ACICS	2008	310
Virginia School of Nursing & Medical Institute	Springfield	Private (not for profit)	Uncategorized	none	1901	Unknown
Virginia Tech Carilion School of Medicine	Roanoke	Public/ private	Uncategorized	none	2010	Unknown
Virginia University of Integrative Medicine	Vienna	Private (not for profit)	Uncategorized	none	2004	457
Washington University of Virginia	Annandale	Private (Baptist)	Uncategorized	none	Unknown	Unknown
Washington University of Science and Technology, formerly IGlobal University	Alexandria	Private (for profit)	Masters university	ACCSC	2008	1,096
William Samson University	Alexandria	Private (not for profit)	Doctoral university	None	2012	Unknown

== Primarily religious institutions ==
School	Location(s)	Control	Type	Accreditation	Founded	Enrollment
Cornerstone College & Seminary	Spotsylvania	Private (not for profit) (Christianic)	Uncategorized	AICCS	1969	Unknown
Hartland College	Rapidan	Private (not for profit)	Uncategorized	none	1983	90 (2015)
John Leland Center for Theological Studies	Falls Church	Private (not for profit)	Uncategorized	none	1998	Unknown
Union Presbyterian Seminary	Richmond	Private (not for profit)	Special focus	ATS	2012	146
Virginia Theological Seminary	Alexandria	Private (not for profit)	Uncategorized	ATS	1818	216
Washington Bible College and Capital Bible Seminary (Springfield Extension)	Springfield	Private (not for profit)	Uncategorized	none	1958	Unknown
William Samson University	Alexandria	Private (not for profit)	Doctoral university	None	2012	Unknown

== Defunct institutions ==
School	Location(s)	Founded	Closed
ACT College	Alexandria, Arlington, Manassas		2012
American College of Commerce and Technology	Falls Church	2010	2017
Argosy University - Washington D.C. area	Arlington		2019
The Art Institute of Washington	Arlington	2000	2018
Baptist Theological Seminary at Richmond	Richmond	1989	2019
Cordoba University	Ashburn		
Eastern College	Front Royal and Manassas	1902	1920
Elizabeth College	Salem	1826	1922
Fairfax University of America	Fairfax	1998	2024
Fauquier Institute	Warrenton	1860	c. 1929
Medtech College	Fairfax	1939	2016
Richmond School of Health and Technology	Multiple	1997	
Saint Paul's College	Lawrenceville	1888	2013
Southeast Culinary & Hospitality College	Bristol	2005	
Stratford College	Danville	1854	1974
Stratford University	Multiple	1976	2022
Sullins College	Bristol	1868	1976
University of Northern Virginia	Annandale	1998	2014
Virginia College	Richmond	1983	2018
Virginia Intermont College	Bristol	1884	2014
Virginia School of Massage	Charlottesville	1995	2018

== See also ==
- Higher education in the United States
- Higher education accreditation in the United States
- List of college athletic programs in Virginia
- List of American institutions of higher education
- List of recognized higher education accreditation organizations
- List of colleges and universities
- List of colleges and universities by country
