= Virtual Library of Virginia =

The Virtual Library of Virginia (VIVA) is a consortium of nonprofit academic libraries within the Commonwealth of Virginia. Members include all of the 39 state-assisted colleges and universities (the six doctoral degree-granting universities, nine four-year institutions, and 24 community and two-year branch colleges), as well as 34 of the independent (private, nonprofit) institutions and the Library of Virginia.

VIVA is an active member of the International Coalition of Library Consortia.

== History ==
The Virtual Library of Virginia was established in July 1994. In September 2003, VIVA received the Governor's Technology Gold Award for Government Service in Higher Education.

A Guide to the Virtual Library of Virginia (VIVA) Records, 1994-2004 is hosted on the George Mason University web site.

== Organizational structure ==
VIVA operates under a memorandum of understanding (MOU). VIVA is headed by a steering committee with 15 members elected from the member institutions, supported by various committees drawn from the constituent organizations. The three standing VIVA Committees are the Outreach Committee, Resources for Users Committee, and the Resource Sharing Committee. Operational responsibility for VIVA is managed by the VIVA staff, consisting of the Director, Associate Director, and Executive Assistant. More information on the VIVA Organizational Plan is available on the VIVA web site.

== Budget and funding ==
In fiscal year 2012, funding from the General Assembly accounted for 44% of VIVA's total budget, down from 77% in fiscal year 2006. Meanwhile, VIVA member institutions increased their contributions to 56% of the total budget. This demonstrates the extraordinary commitment of VIVA institutions to acquiring and providing essential resources to the Virginia higher education community, highlighting the power of the VIVA cooperative. Previous biennial budgets allocated to VIVA by the General Assembly can be found on the VIVA site .

== Member institutions ==
Public Institutions - Colleges and Universities
College of William & Mary	George Mason University	Old Dominion University	University of Virginia
Virginia Commonwealth University	Virginia Tech	Christopher Newport University	James Madison University
Longwood University	Norfolk State University	Radford University	University of Mary Washington
University of Virginia's College at Wise	Virginia Military Institute	Virginia State University	
Public Institutions - Community and 2-Year Branch Colleges
Blue Ridge Community College	Central Virginia Community College	Dabney S. Lancaster Community College	Danville Community College
Eastern Shore Community College	Germanna Community College	J. Sargeant Reynolds Community College	Brightpoint Community College
Laurel Ridge Community College	Mountain Empire Community College	New River Community College	Northern Virginia Community College
Patrick & Henry Community College	Paul D. Camp Community College	Piedmont Virginia Community College	Rappahannock Community College
Richard Bland College	Southside Virginia Community College	Southwest Virginia Community College	Thomas Nelson Community College
Tidewater Community College	Virginia Community College System	Virginia Highlands Community College	Virginia Western Community College
Wytheville Community College			
Private, Not-for-Profit Institutions
Appalachian School of Law	Appalachian College of Pharmacy	Averett University	Bluefield College
Bridgewater College	Christendom College	Eastern Mennonite University	Eastern Virginia Medical School
Emory & Henry College	Ferrum College	Hampden-Sydney College	Hampton University
Hollins University	Institute for the Psychological Sciences	Jefferson College of Health Sciences	Liberty University
Lynchburg College	Mary Baldwin College	Marymount University	Randolph College
Randolph-Macon College	Regent University	Roanoke College	Shenandoah University
Southern Virginia University	Sweet Briar College	Union-PSCE	University of Richmond
Virginia College of Osteopathic Medicine	Virginia Union University	Virginia Wesleyan College	Washington & Lee University
Educational and Research Institutions
New College Institute	Institute for Advanced Learning and Research	Library of Virginia	Roanoke Higher Education Center
Southwest Virginia Higher Education Center			
