= Vehicle registration plates of Virginia =

Virginia vehicle license plates

Virginia
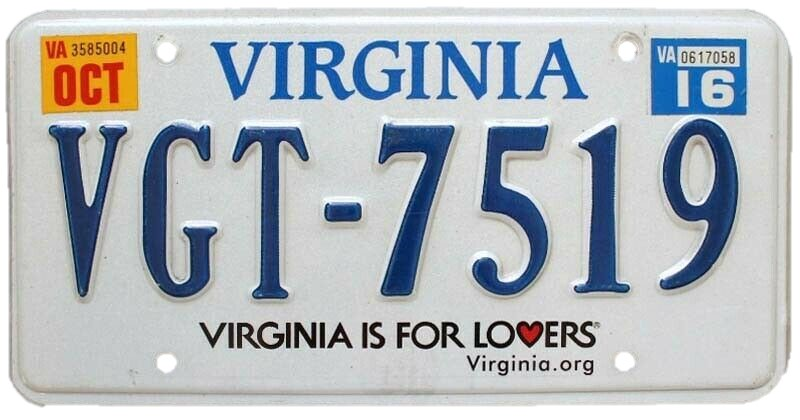

Current series
- Slogan: Virginia is for Lovers
- Size: 12 in × 6 in 30 cm × 15 cm
- Material: Aluminum
- Serial format: ABC-1234
- Introduced: March 2014

Availability
- Issued by: Virginia Department of Motor Vehicles

History
- First issued: June 1906

The U.S. state of Virginia first required its residents to register their motor vehicles and display license plates in 1906. As of 2026, plates are issued by the Virginia Department of Motor Vehicles (DMV). Front and rear plates are required for most classes of vehicles, while only rear plates are required for motorcycles and trailers.

== Motor vehicle registration statistics ==
As of 2008, the DMV has 7,698,416 active registrations, 1,696,795 (22%) of which are special or personalized plates. One out of every ten personalized license plates in the United States is registered to a Virginian driver. The high take-up of vanity plates in the state is arguably due to the fact that, unlike in many other states, a personalized plate in Virginia costs just $10 more than a randomly-assigned registration plate. In 2008, 1,624,146 pairs of license plates were sold, with 831,361 of them being personalized plates.

== Passenger baseplates ==
=== 1906 to 1972 ===
In 1956, the United States, Canada, and Mexico came to an agreement with the American Association of Motor Vehicle Administrators, the Automobile Manufacturers Association and the National Safety Council that standardized the size for license plates for vehicles (except those for motorcycles) at 6 inches (15 cm) in height by 12 inches (30 cm) in width, with standardized mounting holes. The first Virginian license plate that complied with these standards was issued eight years beforehand, in 1948.

No slogans were used on passenger plates during the period covered by this subsection.

Image	Dates issued	Design	Serial format	Serials issued	Notes
	1906–10	White serial on black porcelain plate; "VA" at right	1234	1 to approximately 4500	
	1910	Red serial on white porcelain plate; "VA. 1910" at right	1234	1 to approximately 2600	First dated plate. Issued only from June 15 through December 31, 1910.
	1911	White serial on blue porcelain plate; "VA. 1911" at right	1234	101 to approximately 4000	
	1912	White serial on green porcelain plate, "VA. 1912" at right	1234	101 to approximately 6000	
	1913	White serial on maroon porcelain plate; "VA 1913" at right	1234	1 to approximately 9000	
	1914	Embossed dark blue serial on white plate; "VA 1914" at right	12345	1 to approximately 14000	First embossed plate.
	1915	Embossed white serial on dark green plate; "VA 1915" at right	12345	1 to approximately 21000	
	1916	Embossed dark blue serial on orange plate; "VA 1916" at right	12345	1 to approximately 35000	
	1917	Embossed white serial on black plate with border line; "VA 1917" at right	12345	1 to approximately 52000	
	1918	Embossed black serial on white plate with border line; "VA 1918" at right	12345	1 to approximately 71000	
	1919	Embossed white serial on black plate with border line; "VA 1919" at right	12345	1 to approximately 88000	
	1920	Embossed white serial on dark green plate with border line; "VA 20" at right	123456	1 to approximately 126000	
	1921	Embossed black serial on orange plate with border line; "VA 21" at right	123-456	1 to approximately 146-000	
	1922	Embossed white serial on dark blue plate; white lines at top and bottom borders; "VA 22" at right	123456	1 to approximately 145000	
	1923	Embossed white serial on dark green plate; white lines at top and bottom borders; "VA 23" at right	123456	1 to approximately 189000	
	1924	Embossed white serial on red plate; "VIRGINIA - 24" centered at top	123456	1 to approximately 217000	Manufactured in New Jersey to the same design as that state's 1924 plates. First use of the full state name.
	1925	Embossed black serial on white plate with border line; "VIRGINIA - 1925" at bottom	123-456	1 to approximately 235-000	
	1926	Embossed golden yellow serial on dark blue plate with border line; "VIRGINIA - 26" centered at top	123-456	1 to approximately 273-000	
	1927	Embossed red serial on green plate with border line; "VIRGINIA - 27" at bottom	123-456	1 to approximately 293-000	
	1928	Embossed orange serial on black plate with border line; "VIRGINIA · 1928" centered at top	123-456	1 to approximately 317-000	
	1929	Embossed black serial on orange plate with border line; "VIRGINIA · 1929" centered at bottom	123-456	1 to approximately 321-000	
	1930	Embossed orange serial on black plate with border line; "VIRGINIA · 1930" centered at top	123-456	1 to approximately 349-000	
	1931	Embossed black serial on orange plate with border line; "VIRGINIA · 1931" centered at bottom	123-456	1 to approximately 368-000	
	1932	Embossed white serial on black plate with border line; "VIRGINIA · 1932" centered at top	123-456	1 to approximately 376-000	
	1933	Embossed black serial on white plate; "VIRGINIA - 1933" at bottom	123-456	1 to approximately 334-000	
	1934	Embossed white serial on black plate; "VIRGINIA - 1934" at top	123-456	1 to approximately 337-000	
	1935	Embossed black serial on white plate; "VIRGINIA - 1935" at top	123-456	1 to approximately 335-000	
	1936	Embossed orange serial on dark blue plate; "VIRGINIA - 1936" at bottom	123-456	1 to approximately 360-000	
	1937	Embossed white serial on black plate; "VIRGINIA - 1937" at top	123-456	1 to approximately 375-000	
	1938	Embossed black serial on white plate; "VIRGINIA - 1938" at bottom	123-456	1 to approximately 388-000	
	1939	Embossed white serial on black plate; "VIRGINIA - 1939" at bottom	123-456	1 to approximately 402-000	
	1940	Embossed black serial on white plate; "1940 - VIRGINIA" at top	123-456	1 to approximately 438-000	
	1941	Embossed white serial on black plate; "19 - VIRGINIA - 41" at top	123-456	1 to approximately 491-000	
	1942–43	Embossed black serial on white plate; "VIRGINIA - 1942" at top	123-456	1 to approximately 524-000	Revalidated for 1943 with black tabs, due to metal conservation for World War II.
	1944	Embossed black serial on yellow plate; "1944 - VA" centered at bottom	123-456	1 to approximately 468-000	
	1945	Embossed black serial on white plate; "19 - VIRGINIA - 45" at bottom	123-456	1 to approximately 475-000	
	1946	Embossed white serial on black plate; "VIRGINIA - 1946" at bottom	123-456	1 to approximately 524-000	
	1947	Embossed black serial on unpainted aluminum plate; "19 VIRGINIA 47" at top	123-456	1 to approximately 567-000	
	1948	Embossed white serial on black plate; "1948 VIRGINIA" at top	123-456	1 to approximately 642-000	
	1949	Embossed black serial on unpainted aluminum plate; "VIRGINIA 1949" at bottom	123-456	1 to approximately 698-000	
	1950	Embossed white serial on black plate; "1950 VIRGINIA" at bottom	123-456	1 to approximately 783-000	
	1951–52	Embossed black serial on white plate; "19 VIRGINIA 51" at bottom	123-456	1 to 999-999	Revalidated for 1952 with black tabs, due to metal conservation for the Korean War. Plates with serials A100-000 and up used narrower serial dies; this practice continued until 1969.
	1951–52	Embossed black serial on white plate; "19 VIRGINIA 51" at bottom	A123-456	A-100 to approximately A145-000	Revalidated for 1952 with black tabs, due to metal conservation for the Korean War. Plates with serials A100-000 and up used narrower serial dies; this practice continued until 1969.
	1953	Embossed orange serial on blue plate; "19 VIRGINIA 53" at top	123-456	1 to approximately 940-000	
	1954	Embossed white serial on black plate; "VIRGINIA 1954" at top	123-456	1 to approximately 999-999	
	1955	Embossed black serial on white plate; "1955 VIRGINIA" at bottom	123-456	1 to 999-999	
	1955	Embossed black serial on white plate; "1955 VIRGINIA" at bottom	A123-456	A-100 to approximately A122-000	
	1956	Embossed white serial on black plate; "19 VIRGINIA 56" at bottom	123-456	1 to 999-999	
	1956	Embossed white serial on black plate; "19 VIRGINIA 56" at bottom	A123-456	A-100 to approximately A178-000	
	1957	Embossed black serial on white plate; "VIRGINIA 1957" at bottom	123-456	1 to 999-999	
	1957	Embossed black serial on white plate; "VIRGINIA 1957" at bottom	A123-456	A-100 to approximately A223-000	
	1958	Embossed white serial on black plate; "1958 VIRGINIA" at top	123-456	1 to 999-999	
	1958	Embossed white serial on black plate; "1958 VIRGINIA" at top	A123-456	A-100 to approximately A232-000	
	1959	Embossed black serial on white plate; "19 VIRGINIA 59" at top	123-456	1 to 999-999	
	1959	Embossed black serial on white plate; "19 VIRGINIA 59" at top	A123-456	A-100 to approximately A259-000	
	1960	Embossed white serial on black plate; "VIRGINIA 1960" at top	123-456	1 to 999-999	
	1960	Embossed white serial on black plate; "VIRGINIA 1960" at top	A123-456	A-100 to approximately A240-000	
	1961	Embossed black serial on white plate; "1961 VIRGINIA" at bottom	123-456	1 to 999-999	
	1961	Embossed black serial on white plate; "1961 VIRGINIA" at bottom	A123-456	A-100 to approximately A273-000	
	1962	Embossed white serial on black plate; "19 VIRGINIA 62" at bottom	123-456	1 to 999-999	
	1962	Embossed white serial on black plate; "19 VIRGINIA 62" at bottom	A123-456	A-100 to approximately A344-000	
	1963	Embossed black serial on white plate; "VIRGINIA 1963" at bottom	123-456	1 to 999-999	
	1963	Embossed black serial on white plate; "VIRGINIA 1963" at bottom	A123-456	A-100 to approximately A425-000	
	1964	Embossed white serial on black plate; "1964 VIRGINIA" at top	123-456	1 to 999-999	
	1964	Embossed white serial on black plate; "1964 VIRGINIA" at top	A123-456	A-100 to approximately A504-000	
	1965	Embossed black serial on white plate; "19 VIRGINIA 65" at top	123-456	1 to 999-999	
	1965	Embossed black serial on white plate; "19 VIRGINIA 65" at top	A123-456	A-100 to approximately A545-000	
	1966	Embossed white serial on black plate; "VIRGINIA 1966" at top	123-456	1 to 999-999	
	1966	Embossed white serial on black plate; "VIRGINIA 1966" at top	A123-456	A-100 to approximately A626-000	
	1967	Embossed black serial on white plate; "1967 VIRGINIA" at bottom	123-456	1 to 999-999	
	1967	Embossed black serial on white plate; "1967 VIRGINIA" at bottom	A123-456	A-100 to approximately A700-000	
	1968	Embossed white serial on black plate; "19 VIRGINIA 68" at bottom	123-456	1 to 999-999	
	1968	Embossed white serial on black plate; "19 VIRGINIA 68" at bottom	A123-456	A-100 to approximately A788-000	
	1969	Embossed black serial on white plate; "VIRGINIA 1969" at bottom	123-456	1 to 999-999	All plates now used the narrower serial dies introduced on the 1951–52 base.
	1969	Embossed black serial on white plate; "VIRGINIA 1969" at bottom	A123-456	A-100 to approximately A857-000	All plates now used the narrower serial dies introduced on the 1951–52 base.
	1970	Embossed white serial on black plate; "1970 VIRGINIA" at top	123-456	1 to 999-999	
	1970	Embossed white serial on black plate; "1970 VIRGINIA" at top	A123-456	A-100 to approximately A966-000	
	1971	Embossed black serial on white plate, with or without border line; "19 VIRGINIA 71" at top	123-456	1 to 999-999	
	1971	Embossed black serial on white plate, with or without border line; "19 VIRGINIA 71" at top	A123-456	A-100 to A999-999	
	1971	Embossed black serial on white plate, with or without border line; "19 VIRGINIA 71" at top	ABC 123	AAA 001 to AAD 999	
	1971	Embossed black serial on white plate, with or without border line; "19 VIRGINIA 71" at top	B12-345	B-1 to approximately B54-000	
	1972	Embossed white serial on black plate with border line; "VIRGINIA 1972" at top	ABC-123	AAA-001 to DZZ-999	Letters I, O and Q not used in serials; this practice continues today (except 1988–92).

=== 1973 to present ===
Image	Dates issued	Design	Slogan	Serial format	Serials issued	Notes
	1973–79	Embossed blue serial on white plate with border line; "VIRGINIA" centered at top	none	ABC-123	AAA-101 to NZZ-999; SAA-101 to SZZ-999	Revalidated with stickers until 1984. 'P' series of serials reserved for light trucks, and 'R' series for rental cars (the latter practice continued until the late 1990s).
	1979–92	Embossed dark blue serial on reflective white plate with border line; "Virginia" screened in blue centered at top	none	ABC-123	AAA-101 to ZZZ-999 (see right)	Still currently revalidated. Serials UAA-101 through ZZZ-999 issued first, followed by AAA-101 through SZZ-999 as 1973–79 plates were invalidated, then (from 1988) all serials with I, O, Q and T as the first letter, and finally (from 1990) all remaining serials with I, O or Q as the second and/or third letters (beginning with AAI-101 and ending with ZZQ-999).
	1993	Embossed dark blue serial on reflective white plate; "Virginia" screened in blue centered at top	none	ABC-1234	ZZZ-9999 to approximately ZXX-1001	Serials progressed backwards, presumably due to the serials on the optional Scenic plate (see Optional plates below) progressing forward from AAA-1001.
	1993 – June; 2002	As above, but with state name in all capital letters	none	ABC-1234	ZXW-9999 to XYN-1001	Serials progressed backwards, presumably due to the serials on the optional Scenic plate (see Optional plates below) progressing forward from AAA-1001.
	July 1, 2002 – early 2003	Embossed dark blue serial on reflective white plate; "VIRGINIA" screened in blue centered at top	"400th Anniversary" in red centered at bottom, with a red ship graphic between the two words, plus "1607" to the left and "2007" to the right	ABC-1234	Exclusively from JAA-1001 to JAX-9999; intermittently from JAY-1001 to JDL-9999	Issued in advance of the 400th anniversary of the founding of Jamestown, the first permanent English settlement in North America. Serials progressed forward from the start of the 'J' series (presumably for Jamestown). The slogan was originally printed on a white sticker, before it started to be screened directly onto the plate at around the JAM series.
	October 2002 – June; 2006	As above, but with state name in red	"400th Anniversary" in red centered at bottom, with a red ship graphic between the two words, plus "1607" to the left and "2007" to the right	ABC-1234	Intermittently from JAY-1001 to JDL-9999; exclusively from JDM-1001 to KCW-9999	Issued in advance of the 400th anniversary of the founding of Jamestown, the first permanent English settlement in North America. Serials progressed forward from the start of the 'J' series (presumably for Jamestown). The slogan was originally printed on a white sticker, before it started to be screened directly onto the plate at around the JAM series.
	June; 2006 – December 2007	Embossed dark blue serial on reflective white plate; "VIRGINIA" screened in red centered at top; Jamestown 400th Anniversary logo screened at bottom left and "2007" at bottom right	"JAMESTOWN" screened in blue and "AMERICA'S 400TH ANNIVERSARY" in red, both centered at bottom	ABC-1234	KCX-1001 to KNP-9999	
	January 2008 – February 2014	Embossed dark blue serial on reflective white plate; "VIRGINIA" screened in blue centered at top	none	ABC-1234	XXP-9999 to approximately WLN-1001	Return to 1993 base. Serials progressed backwards as before. 'R' series reserved for rental vehicles.
	March 2014 – present	Embossed dark blue serial on reflective white plate; "VIRGINIA" screened in blue centered at top	"VIRGINIA IS FOR LOVERS" screened in black, plus a red heart for the second 'V', centered at bottom	ABC-1234	VAA-1001 to VZZ-9999; UZZ-9999 to SUE-5647 (as of July 21, 2026)	Serials progressed forward through the 'V' series (presumably for Virginia), then backwards through the 'U', 'T', and now 'S' series.

== Non-passenger plates ==
Image	Type	First issued	Design	Serial format	Serials issued	Notes
	Antique Vehicle	?	white on black aluminum with "ANTIQUE VEHICLE" and "VA." on right	1234; 12345; 1234A; A1234; 123AB; AB123	1001 to 99999; ?	
	Antique Vehicle	?	blue on reflective yellow with blue screened state name	12345; 1234AB; AB1234	10001 to 99999; ? ; 1001DW to 9999DZ; 1001EV to 9999FA; 1001FE to 9999FE; 1001YM to 6250YM (as of May 3, 2026)	
	Disabled person	1993	blue on reflective white with blue screened state name	123456	100001 to approximately 340000	Embossed International Symbol of Access at left.
	Disabled person	2006	same as 2006-2007 Jamestown base	12345 H/P	10001 H/P to approximately 47000 H/P	Embossed International Symbol of Access at left.
	Disabled person	2008	blue on reflective white with blue screened state name	123456	approximately 360000 to approximately 436000	Embossed International Symbol of Access at left.
	Disabled person	2014	same as 2014- base	12345H; 1234DA	10001H to 99999H; 1001DA to 1577DT (as of January 11, 2026)	Embossed International Symbol of Access at left.
	Motorcycle	1975	Embossed dark blue serial on non-reflective white plate with border line; "VA." embossed in blue centered at top	123456	1 to approximately 370000	
	Motorcycle	1979	As above, but reflective	123456	370001 to approximately 960000	
	Motorcycle	1992	As above, but without border line	123456	960001 to 999999, then 10001 to 960000	
	Motorcycle	2018	As above, but without border line	A12345; 12345A	Z10001 to Z99999; W10001 to W99999; 10001W to 99999W	
	Motorcycle	2024	As above, but "VA" screened in blue centered at top	A12345	J10001 to J99999; N10001 to N55947 (as of January 11, 2026)	Design appears on some later 99999W serials
	Truck	1973	same as 1973 base	TA12-345, T/A 12-345, T/A 123-456	T/A 10-001 to approximately T/R 500-000	
	Truck	1993	same as 1994 base	T/A 12-345, T/A 123-456	Approximately T/T 10-001 to approximately T/X 320-000	
	Truck	2020?	same as 2014 base, but reads "TRUCK" in red below	UA12-345	UA10-001 to UC92-731 (as of March 14, 2026)	
	Truck (Permanent)	1993	same as 1994 base	12-345 T/A	10-001 T/A to approximately 49-000 T/B	
	Truck (Permanent)	2014	same as 2014 base, but reads "TRUCK PERMANENT" in red below	12-345UA	10-001UA to 64-241UA (as of January 11, 2026)	

=== Government and exempt plates ===
Image	Type	First issued	Design	Serial format	Serials issued	Notes
	Local Government		Embossed dark blue serial on reflective tan plate; on the top the plate reads "VIRGINIA" and on the bottom the plate reads "OFFICIAL LOCAL GOVERNMENT USE ONLY", with dark blue border.	12-345L	10-001L to 99-999L	
	Local Government	late 1990's	Embossed dark blue serial on reflective tan plate; on the top the plate reads "VIRGINIA" and on the bottom the plate reads "OFFICIAL LOCAL GOVERNMENT USE ONLY".	123-456L	100-001L to 269-254L (as of March 23, 2026)	
	Local Government – Motorcycle		Embossed dark blue serial on reflective tan plate; on the top the plate reads "VIRGINIA" and on the bottom the plate reads "OFFICIAL LOCAL GOVERNMENT USE ONLY".	1234L	1000L to 2553L (as of March 23, 2026)	
	State Government		Embossed dark blue serial on reflective light blue plate; on the top the plate reads "VIRGINIA" and on the bottom the plate reads "OFFICIAL STATE USE ONLY".	12-345S	10-001S to 86-960S (as of March 23, 2026)	
	State Police	1993	Embossed dark blue serial on reflective white plate; on the top the plate reads "VIRGINIA" and on the bottom the plate reads "STATE POLICE", colored Virginia State Police badge to left	1234	1001 to approximately 6000	
	State Police	2016, 2024	Same as above, but blue and white VSP badge	1234	6000 to 8000; 8201 to 8734 (as of March 23, 2026)	
	State Police	2022	Same as 1993 base, but with stacked S/P serials	S/P 1234	approximately S/P 8000 to approximately S/P 8200	
	State Police – Motorcycle	1993	Embossed dark blue serial on reflective white plate; on the top the plate reads "VIRGINIA" and on the bottom the plate reads "STATE POLICE", colored Virginia State Police badge to left	12, 123, 1234		

== Optional plates ==
Virginia offers 333 optional license plates. Most can be personalized for an additional fee. Listed below are the most popular of those available optionals.

Image	Type	Dates issued	Design	Serial format	Serials issued	Notes
	Autumn Leaves	May – October 1997	Embossed dark blue serial on reflective white plate; ten orange and yellow gradient leaves behind serial; "Virginia" screened in black centered at top	1234-ABC	1000-AAA to approximately 9999-AAD	
	Autumn Leaves	October 1997 – present	As above, but with leaves around edge of plate	1234-ABC	1000-BAA to 8816-BBM (as of March 7, 2026)	Revised design introduced in response to visibility concerns surrounding the original design.
	Cardinal	? – present	Embossed dark blue serial on reflective graphic plate of the Northern cardinal on light blue field; "Virginia" screened in dark blue centered at top	AB-1234; 1234-AB	AA-1001 to ZZ-9999 (Note: Many prefixes skipped along the way.); AG-1001 to AK-9999; 1001-EA to 9999-EB; 1001-ZY to 9999-ZZ; BD-1001 to BE-2647 (as of March 7, 2026)	
	Chesapeake Bay	December 1992 – present	Embossed dark blue serial on reflective light blue plate; graphic design including a crab, seaweed, and shells near the bottom of the plate	CB-1234; C12345	C10001 to C95919 (as of March 23, 2026)	
	Independence Bicentennial	1975–82	Embossed blue serial on reflective white plate with border line; blue bust of George Washington and thirteen red stars (representing the original colonies) screened in the center; "Virginia" and "1776 Independence Bicentennial 1976" screened in red centered at top and bottom respectively	123-456	100-001 to 500-000	Still currently revalidated.
	Great Seal	1986 – present	Embossed dark blue serial on reflective white background with Virginia state seal placed in center	123 456	500 001 to 773 153 (as of March 6, 2026)	Continuation to Independence Bicentennial
	George Washington Bicentennial	1999 to ?	Dark blue on Flag of the United States with image of Washington.	1234WB	1001WB to ?	Awarded "Plate of the Year" for best new license plate of 1999 by the Automobile License Plate Collectors Association, the first and, to date, only time Virginia has been so honored.
	In God We Trust	? – present	Embossed dark blue serial on reflective graphic plate of the flag of the United States waving; "Virginia" screened in dark blue centered at top	1234AB; 123-45AB	100-01HM to 999-50HM; 100-01HZ to 133-67HZ (as of May 24, 2026)	HM, HZ, PZ, UZ, GD, TR suffixes used with 1234AB format. Currently, 123-45AB format issued using those same suffixes.
	Patriot	May 1997 – present	Similar to passenger base, but with Revolutionary War fifer graphic at right	123ABC	101AAA to 562AER (as of August 20, 2025)	
	Scenic (Mountain to Seashore)	July 1992 – present	Embossed dark blue serial on reflective graphic plate with pale blue sky, light blue mountains, green fields, yellow sand and light blue sea; "VIRGINIA" screened in blue centered at top	ABC-1234	AAB-1001 to AFC-9384 (as of May 24, 2026)	

== Temporary plates ==
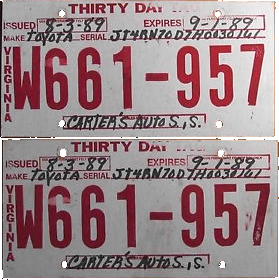
1989

== Type codes ==
The format for the majority of Virginia specialty license plates is 1234AB and AB1234. Below is a table with the prefixes and suffixes of all of the specialty license plates for Virginia.

Code	Prefix	Suffix
AA	cardinal	
AB	cardinal	I'm Animal Friendly
AC	cardinal	Averett University (Averett College prior to 2001)
AD	cardinal	Veteran — Armed Forces
AE	cardinal	Virginia Aviation
AF	cardinal	Veteran — Armed Forces
AG	cardinal	Permanent Trailer — Airgas
AH	cardinal	Antique (blue/yellow)
AJ	cardinal	
AK	cardinal	Alpha Kappa Alpha
AK	cardinal	Permanent Apportioned — Airgas
AL	Antique (blue/yellow)	Fight Terrorism (A/L)
AM	Texas A&M University	I'm Animal Friendly; National Air and Space Museum
AN		Fight Terrorism (A/N)
AP	Appalachian State University	Alpha Phi Alpha
AP	Appalachian Trail	Alpha Phi Alpha
AQ	Antique (blue/yellow)	Antique (blue/yellow)
AR	Army Reserve; Virginia 250	Permanent Apportioned — Airgas
AS		National Air and Space Museum
AT	Antique (blue/yellow)	Virginians for the Arts
AU		Auburn University
AV		Antique (blue/yellow)
AW		Antique (blue/yellow)
AX		Alexandria
AY		Antique (blue/yellow)
BA		Wildlife Conservationist − bass
BB		Wildlife Conservationist − bass
BC	Bridgewater College	Breast Cancer
BD	cardinal	Wildlife Conservationist − bear
BE	cardinal	Protect Pollinators
BF	Bluefield College	Tiger Swallowtail - State Insect
BF	Blue Ridge Parkway	Tiger Swallowtail - State Insect
BG	cardinal	Airborne (173 ABN BDE Sky Soldiers)
BH		Tiger Swallowtail - State Insect
BI		Share the Road
BJ		Wildlife Conservationist − bear
BL		Permanent Trailer — Small (B/L)
BM		Blue Ridge Parkway
BN	cardinal	Wildlife Conservationist − bluebird
BP		Antique (blue/yellow)
BQ		Antique (blue/yellow)
BR	Blue Ridge Community College	Blue Ridge Parkway
BT		Wildlife Conservationist − brook trout
BU		BoatUS
BV	cardinal	Friends of the Blue Ridge
BV	cardinal	Blue Ridge Parkway
BW		Bowler
BX	cardinal	Antique (blue/yellow)
BZ	Bronze Star	Bronze Star - Valor
CA		Virginia Breast Cancer Foundation
CB	Chesapeake Bay	
CC	Permanent Trailer — Small (C/C)	Commonwealth College
CC	Permanent Trailer — Small (C/C)	Cure Childhood Cancer
CD	Permanent Trailer — Small (C/D)	I'm Animal Friendly
CF	cardinal	Clean Special Fuel
CG	United States Coast Guard Auxiliary (C/G)	U.S. Coast Guard
CH		Chesterfield County
CI	The Citadel	AFL-CIO
CJ		Virginia Railway Heritage
CK		Chesapeake City
CL		Remember the USS Cole
CL		Choose Life
CM		Friends of Coal
CN	Christopher Newport University	Combat Infantryman
CP	Virginia Society of CPAs	Washington Capitals
CR		Credit Unions
CT	Clean Special Fuel	
CU		Clemson University
CV	University of Virginia's College at Wise	Sons of Confederate Veterans
CW		Colonial Williamsburg
CX	cardinal	Clean Special Fuel
CY	Clean Special Fuel	Clean Special Fuel
CZ	cardinal	Clean Special Fuel
DA	Drive-Away (D/A)	Disabled Person
DB		Drive Out Diabetes
DC	Danville Community College	I'm Animal Friendly
DD		Disabled Person
DE		Disabled Person
DF		Distinguished Flying Cross
DG		Disabled Person
DH		Disabled Person
DJ		Disabled Person
DK		Duke University
DL	cardinal	Dabney S. Lancaster Community College
DN		Disabled Person
DP	cardinal	Disabled Person
DR		Drive Smart
DS	Delta Sigma Theta	
DT		Don't Tread On Me
DT		Disabled Person
DU		Ducks Unlimited
DV	Disabled Veteran (D/V)	
DW		Antique (blue/yellow)
DX	cardinal	Antique (blue/yellow)
DY	cardinal	Antique (blue/yellow)
DZ		Antique (blue/yellow)
EA		cardinal
EB		Protect Pollinators
EC	Lineman	East Carolina University
ED		Education Begins at Home
EE		Mountain Empire Community College
EF		Enduring Freedom Veteran
EG		Wildlife Conservationist − bald eagle
EH	Emory and Henry University	Wildlife Conservationist − bald eagle
EJ	cardinal	
EL		Elon College
EM		Eastern Mennonite University; Emergency Vehicle
EN	cardinal	
EP	cardinal	
EQ	Equipment (E/Q)	
ER	Germanna Community College	
ES		Eastern Shore
ET		Eastern Shore
EU	cardinal	
EV	Eastern Virginia Medical School	Emergency Vehicle
EV	Emergency Vehicle	Emergency Vehicle
EW	cardinal	
EX		Antique (blue/yellow)
EY	cardinal	Antique (blue/yellow)
EZ		Antique (blue/yellow)
FA		Antique (blue/yellow)
FB	Franchised Motorcycle Dealer (F/B)	Tiger Swallowtail - State Insect
FC	Ferrum College	
FD	Firefighter	Fight Terrorism (F/D)
FE		Antique (blue/yellow)
FG	cardinal	Virginia Farms
FH	cardinal	
FJ		Wildflowers
FK	cardinal	
FL		Wildflowers
FM	Franchised Motor Home Dealer	
FP	Fraternal Order of Police	
FR		Fight Terrorism (F/R)
FS		Florida State University
FT	Franchised Trailer Dealer (F/T)	Fight Terrorism (F/T)
FV	Farm Use Vehicle	
FW		Fight Terrorism (F/W) (motorcycle)
FW		Veterans of Foreign Wars
FX	Fairfax	Foxhunting
FY	cardinal	Iraqi Freedom Veteran
FZ	cardinal	Wildflowers
GA	cardinal	Greyhound Adoption
GB		Tiger Swallowtail - State Insect
GD		In God We Trust
GL	Freemason	
GM	George Mason University	George Mason Patriots
GO		U.S. Army
GS		Gold Star (G/S)
GT		Georgia Tech
GT		Virginia Tech University — Go Hokies
GU	Georgetown University	
GV	cardinal	Stop Gun Violence
GW		George Washington University
GX	cardinal	
HA	Truck For Hire (H/A)	Virginia Children's Trust Fund — Hand
HB		Tiger Swallowtail - State Insect
HC		Hollins University (Hollins College prior to 1998)
HD		Harley Owners Group
HE		Horse Enthusiast
HF		Harley Owners Group
HI		Ohio State University
HJ		Horse Enthusiast
HK		Virginia Tech — Go Hokies
HM		In God We Trust
HN		Horse Enthusiast
HP	Handicapped (H/P)	
HQ	Manufacturer (H/Q)	
HS		Hampden–Sydney College
HT		Virginia Children's Trust Fund — Heart
HU		Hampton University
HV		Horse Enthusiast
HZ		In God We Trust
IC		Internet Capital
ID	Independent Dealer	
JB		Parrotheads
JC		Jefferson College of Health Sciences
JD		Parrotheads
JM	James Madison University — Seal	James Madison University — Athletics
JR		James River Park System
JS		J. S. Reynolds Community College
JT	John Tyler Community College	
JV	cardinal	
JX	cardinal	
JY	cardinal	
KC	Knights of Columbus	
KD		Virginia Kids Eat Free
KE	cardinal	
KF		Kids First
KG		Kids First
KH		Kids First
KM	cardinal	
KN	cardinal	
KP	cardinal	
KV	Korean War Veteran	
KW		Eyes on the Road
KX	cardinal	
KY	cardinal	
LA		Lighthouses
LB		Liberty University
LC		Lynchburg College
LD		Lighthouses
LE		General Robert E. Lee
LF		Lighthouses
LG		Lighthouses
LH		Alzheimer's Association
LH		Lighthouses
LI		Lighthouses
LJ		Lighthouses
LK		Lighthouses
LM		Lighthouses
LN		Legion of Merit
LP		Lighthouses
LR		NASA Langley Research Center
LT		Lighthouses
LU		Liberty University
LV	Lions of Virginia	Choose Life
LW	Longwood University	Police - Heroes Live Forever
LX	cardinal	Lord Fairfax Community College
LY	cardinal	Low-Speed Vehicle
LZ	cardinal	
MA	Military Assault Force	Lighthouses
MC		Virginia Commonwealth University — Seal
MC		United We Stand
MD	Air Medal	
ME		Lighthouses
MG		Lighthouses
MH	cardinal	University of Michigan
MI		Lighthouses
ML		Marine Corps League
MM		Meg's Miles
MN		US Marine Corps
MO		Move Over
MP	cardinal	
MR		Lighthouses
MR		US Marine Corps
MS		Marshall University
MU	cardinal	Marymount University
MV	cardinal	Move Over
MW	University of Mary Washington	
MX	cardinal	
MY		Support Our Troops
MZ	cardinal	
NA	United States Naval Academy	Oceana Naval Air Station
NB		Natural Bridge
NC	cardinal	
ND	University of Notre Dame	
NE		Natural Bridge
NF		Nurses
NH	cardinal	
NJ	cardinal	Rutgers University
NK	cardinal	
NL	cardinal	Donate Life
NN	cardinal	Northern Neck
NR	Naval Reserve	National Rifle Association
NS	Norfolk State University	Newport News Shipbuilding
NT	Christopher Newport University	Washington Nationals
NU		North Carolina State University
NV	Northern Virginia Community College	Naval Aviator
NX	cardinal	
NY	cardinal	United States Navy
NZ	cardinal	
OD	Old Dominion University	
PC	Paul D. Camp Community College	Peace Begins at Home
PD		Fight Terrorism (P/D)
PE		Permanent Apportioned — Penske
PF	Professional Firefighter	
PG		Operation Desert Shield/Storm Veteran
PH	Purple Heart	Pearl Harbor Survivor; Parrotheads
PK	cardinal	Permanent Apportioned — Penske
PL	cardinal	
PN	Poquoson	
PO	Poquoson	
PR		Professional Firefighter
PS	Penn State University	Peace (Dove); Virginia Community Peacebuilding
PT		Fight Terrorism (P/T)
PV	Ride-Sharing	Piedmont Virginia Community College
PZ		In God We Trust
QQ	Omega Psi Phi	
RA	Rental Truck (stacked)	#TeamTommie
RB	Rental Truck (stacked)	
RD		Washington Redskins
RE		Lighthouses
RE		Regent University
RM		Randolph–Macon College — Seal
RN		Ruritan National
RP		Richmond Planet
RS	Rescue Squad	Fight Terrorism (R/S)
RU		Radford University
RW		Randolph College (Randolph-Macon Woman's College prior to 2007)
RY		Rotary International
SA	Bronze Star − Two Awards	Wildlife Conservationist − Red Salamander
SB	cardinal	Sweet Briar College
SC		University of South Carolina
SE	Protect Sea Life	
SF	US Marine Corps	Surfrider Foundation
SJ		Shenandoah National Park
SK	cardinal	
SL	Protect Sea Life	U.S. Army
SL	Silver Star	U.S. Army
SM		Smith Mountain Lake
SN		Shenandoah National Park
SP	State Police (S/P)	Special Forces Association; Shenandoah National Park
SR	Street Rod	Shriner
ST		Virginia Children's Trust Fund — Star
SU		Shenandoah University
SV		Shenandoah National Park
SY	cardinal	
TA	Power Unit Truck	
TB	Power Unit Truck	
TC	Power Unit Truck	
TD	Power Unit Truck (T/D)	Tidewater Community College
TE	Power Unit Truck (T/E)	Don't Tread on Me
TF	Power Unit Truck (T/F)	
TG	Power Unit Truck (T/G)	Don't Tread on Me
TH	Truck For Hire	Tobacco Heritage
TI		Friends of Tibet
TJ	Power Unit Truck (T/J)	Don't Tread on Me
TK	Power Unit Truck (T/K)	Wildlife Conservationist − turkey
TL	Power Unit Truck (T/L)	
TM	Power Unit Truck (T/M)	Don't Tread on Me
TN	Power Unit Truck (T/N)	3rd U.S. Infantry Regiment (The Old Guard)
TN	Power Unit Truck (T/N)	University of Tennessee
TP	Power Unit Truck (T/P)	Don't Tread on Me
TR	Private Trailer	Don't Tread on Me; In God We Trust
TS	Power Unit Truck (T/S)	Don't Tread on Me
TT	Power Unit Truck (T/T)	
TU	Power Unit Truck (T/U)	Don't Tread on Me
TV	Power Unit Truck (T/V)	Virginia Tech - VT
TW	Power Unit Truck (T/W)	Tow Truck
TX	Power Unit Truck (T/X)	Don't Tread on Me
TY		College of William & Mary — Athletics
TZ	Virginia Tech — Mountains	Tow Truck
UA	cardinal	Unlocking Autism
UB		War of 1812
UD		Used Car Dealer (U/D)
UE	cardinal	Don't Tread on Me
UF		University of Florida
UG	cardinal	Don't Tread on Me
UH		Don't Tread on Me
UJ	cardinal	Don't Tread on Me
UK	cardinal	
UL	cardinal	Don't Tread on Me
UM	cardinal	University of Maryland
UN		University of North Carolina
UP	cardinal	United We Stand
UQ		Don't Tread on Me
UR	University of Richmond — Spider	University of Richmond — Crest
US		United We Stand
UT	Private Trailer (U/T)	Don't Tread on Me
UU	cardinal	Don't Tread on Me
UV	University of Virginia — Rotunda	University of Virginia
UW	cardinal	United We Stand
UW	cardinal	United We Stand (U/W) (motorcycle)
UX	cardinal	Don't Tread on Me
UY	cardinal	Don't Tread on Me
UZ	cardinal	In God We Trust
VA		Rotary International
VB	Virginia Beach	
VC	Virginia Commonwealth University — Ram	
VE	cardinal	
VF		Disabled Veteran
VG	cardinal	Disabled Veteran
VH	Virginia Highlands Community College	Virginia Tech - VT
VI		Virginia Railway Heritage
VJ	cardinal	
VK		Disabled Veteran
VL		Disabled Veteran
VM	Virginia Military Institute	Disabled Veteran
VN		Disabled Veteran
VP	State Parks	Virginia Tech - Mountains
VR	cardinal	Virginia Realtors
VS	Virginia State University — Trojan	Veteran — Armed Forces
VT	Virginia Tech — Seal	Iraqi Freedom Veteran
VT	Virginia Tech — Seal	Virginia Tech — Hokie Bird
VU	Villanova University	Virginia Union University
VV	Vietnam Veterans of America	Vietnam Veteran
VW	Virginia Wesleyan University	
VX	cardinal	University of Virginia — Sabre
VY	cardinal	
VZ	cardinal	
WA		Washington Redskins
WA		Williamsburg 300th Anniversary
WB		Williamsburg 300th Anniversary
WB		George Washington Bicentennial
WD	cardinal	Wildlife Conservationist − white-tailed deer
WF		Wallops Flight Facility
WG		Williamsburg 300th Anniversary
WH	cardinal	
WJ		Wildlife Conservationist − white-tailed deer
WK	cardinal	
WL	Washington and Lee University	Wildlife Conservationist − mallard
WM	College of William & Mary	
WN	cardinal	
WP	United States Military Academy	
WS		Wildlife Conservationist - eagle
WT	Tow Truck	
WV	cardinal	West Virginia University; Women Veterans
WW		World War II Veteran
WX	cardinal	
WY	cardinal	
WZ	cardinal	
XA	For Hire Tractor (X/A)	Don't Tread on Me
XB		Don't Tread on Me
XC		Don't Tread on Me
XD		Don't Tread on Me
XE		Don't Tread on Me
XF		Don't Tread on Me
XG		Don't Tread on Me
XH		Don't Tread on Me
XJ		Don't Tread on Me
XK		Don't Tread on Me
XL		Don't Tread on Me
XM		Don't Tread on Me
XN		Don't Tread on Me
XP		Don't Tread on Me
XR		Don't Tread on Me
XS		Don't Tread on Me
XT		Don't Tread on Me
XU		Don't Tread on Me
XV		Don't Tread on Me
XW		Don't Tread on Me
XX		Don't Tread on Me
XY		Don't Tread on Me
YA	Power Unit Tractor (Y/A)	
YH	Tractor For Hire	
YJ		Randolph–Macon College — Athletics
YM		Antique (blue/yellow)
YN		Antique (blue/yellow)
ZA	cardinal	Permanent Trailer — Small (Z/A)
ZB	cardinal	
ZC	cardinal	
ZD	cardinal	Permanent Trailer — Small (Z/D)
ZE	cardinal	Permanent Trailer — Small (Z/E)
ZF	cardinal	
ZG	cardinal	
ZH	cardinal	Permanent Trailer — Small (Z/H)
ZJ	cardinal	
ZK	cardinal	
ZL	cardinal	Permanent Trailer — Small (Z/L)
ZM	cardinal	Permanent Trailer — Small (Z/M)
ZN	cardinal	
ZP	cardinal	
ZQ		Permanent Trailer — Small (Z/Q)
ZR	cardinal	Permanent Trailer — Small (Z/R)
ZS	cardinal	
ZT	cardinal	Permanent Trailer — Small (Z/T)
ZU	cardinal	Permanent Trailer — Small (Z/U)
ZV	cardinal	
ZW	cardinal	Permanent Trailer — Small (Z/W)
ZX	cardinal	
ZY	cardinal	cardinal
ZZ	cardinal	cardinal
