= Candice Rose Martinez =

American criminal

- Other names: Cell Phone Bandit
- Education: Northern Virginia Community College
- Known for: bank robberies
- Criminal charges: 2 felony charges
- Criminal penalty: 12 years in the Federal Bureau of Prisons
- Criminal status: Felony

Candice Rose Martinez (born c. 1986), also known as the "Cell Phone Bandit," is an American criminal who committed four bank robberies in Northern Virginia in October and November 2005, when she was a 19-year-old Northern Virginia Community College student. She was dubbed the "Cell Phone Bandit" by the media because she spoke on her cell phone while committing the robberies.

Martinez received international notoriety when surveillance footage of the robberies was aired on newscasts worldwide, showing her talking on her cell phone during the robberies. It was later discovered that Martinez was talking to her 19-year-old boyfriend Dave C. Williams, who was also driving her getaway car. The case attracted widespread attention due to Martinez's being a young, attractive female college student, as well as the brazen way she conducted the robberies while calmly talking on her phone.

Williams and Martinez were arrested on November 14 and November 15, 2005, respectively. Martinez confessed shortly after her arrest. A total of $48,620 was stolen in the four heists. The couple bought a 1997 Acura Integra, two big-screen televisions, and plenty of designer clothes and bags, court records state.

On December 13, 2005, Martinez pled guilty in the U.S. District Court for the Eastern District of Virginia in Alexandria to two felony charges. On March 3, 2006, she was sentenced to 12 years in the Federal Bureau of Prisons, to be followed by five years of supervised release (probation), a $200 special assessment (court costs), and $43,850 in restitution by U.S. District Judge Gerald Bruce Lee. She was released from prison on July 1, 2016.
