= Wytheville Community College =

Community college in Wytheville, Virginia, U.S.

- Seal of the school
- Type: Public community college
- Established: September 19, 1963
- Parent institution: Virginia Tech (1963–1967); Virginia Community College System (1967–present)
- Accreditation: SACS
- President: Dean E. Sprinkle
- Location: Wytheville, Virginia, U.S. 36°57′27″N 81°04′14″W
- Campus: 148 acres (0.60 km^{2}; 0.231 sq mi); Rural
- Other campuses: Galax, Virginia (WCC at the Crossroads Institute); Marion, Virginia (WCC at the Henderson/WCC WEST)
- Colors: Maroon and white
- Nickname: Wildcats
- Sporting affiliations: NJCAA Division III – Carolinas Junior College Conference (Region 10)
- Website: www.wcc.vccs.edu

Wytheville Community College (WCC) is a public community college in Wytheville, Virginia, United States. It is part of the Virginia Community College System (VCCS). The college serves the citizens of Bland, Carroll, Grayson, Smyth (Marion and eastward), and Wythe counties, and the City of Galax.

== History ==
The Virginia General Assembly authorized WCC's creation in 1962, as a two-year branch of Virginia Tech. The school opened for its first term on September 19, 1963. WCC joined the Virginia Community College System when it was formed in 1967.

=== Presidents of Wytheville Community College ===
WCC has had six presidents since becoming part of the VCCS in 1967. While a branch of Virginia Tech, it was headed by a director, overseen by the parent school's president and board of visitors. Dr. Dean E. Sprinkle has been president since 2015.

- J. Wade Gilley (1967–1972)
- Laurence V. Lauth (1972–1980)
- William F. Snyder (1980– January 2, 2001)
- Ann Alexander (2001–2006)
- Charlie White (May 2006 – June 30, 2015)
- Dean E. Sprinkle (July 1, 2015–present)

== Academic offerings ==
WCC offers nearly thirty academic programs, which include university parallel programs (transfer), occupational-technical programs, and health professions programs. The college awards the associate degree, diplomas, and certificates.
