= Northern Virginia Community College =

Education institution in Alexandria, Virginia, US

Coordinates: 38.834138°N 77.236692°W

- Type: Public community college
- Established: February 8, 1965; 61 years ago
- Parent institution: Virginia Community College System
- Academic affiliations: CUWMA
- President: Anne M. Kress
- Students: 51,896 (fall 2022)
- Location: Annandale, Virginia, United States
- Campus: Six campuses in Northern Virginia
- Website: www.nvcc.edu

Northern Virginia Community College (NVCC and, informally, NOVA) is a public community college with six campuses and four centers in the Northern Virginia suburbs of Washington, D.C. It is the third-largest multi-campus community college in the United States and the second-largest educational institution in Virginia, after Liberty University.

The college is part of the Virginia Community College System. Anne M. Kress has been its president since January 13, 2020. NOVA has campuses in Alexandria, Annandale, Loudoun County, Manassas, Springfield and Woodbridge.

Northern Virginia Community College (Northern Virginia)
Location of NVCC campuses

== History ==
The college was established on February 8, 1965, under the name Northern Virginia Technical College. In the fall of 1965, the college opened with 761 students in a single building in Bailey's Crossroads under president Robert L. McKee. To accommodate an ever-growing student body, the college purchased 78 acres (320,000 m^{2}) in Annandale in 1966 to create the first of six permanent campus sites. NOVA has also offered distance learning courses since 1975.

== Academics ==
The college includes nearly 75,000 students and more than 2,500 faculty and staff members. NOVA is also one of the most internationally diverse colleges in the United States, with a student body consisting of individuals from more than 180 countries. NOVA is accredited by the Southern Association of Colleges and Schools and offers more than 160 degrees at the associate level and certificate programs. NOVA also offers distance learning programs through their Extended Learning Institute (ELI) and continuing education courses through Workforce Development. The college encourages students to enroll in four-year colleges after completing their NOVA education. Its feeder program guarantees admission to partnered intrastate schools.

NOVA offers dual-enrollment so high-school students can enroll in classes.

NOVA also offers online programs known as NOVA Online.

The college is served by a library system extending across all six campuses and the Arlington Center. NOVA Libraries contain more than 250,000 volumes and subscribe to more than 200 databases, many of these purchased through the Virtual Library of Virginia, meaning that NOVA students have access to many of the same resources as the other colleges and universities in Virginia.

== Campuses ==
=== Alexandria ===
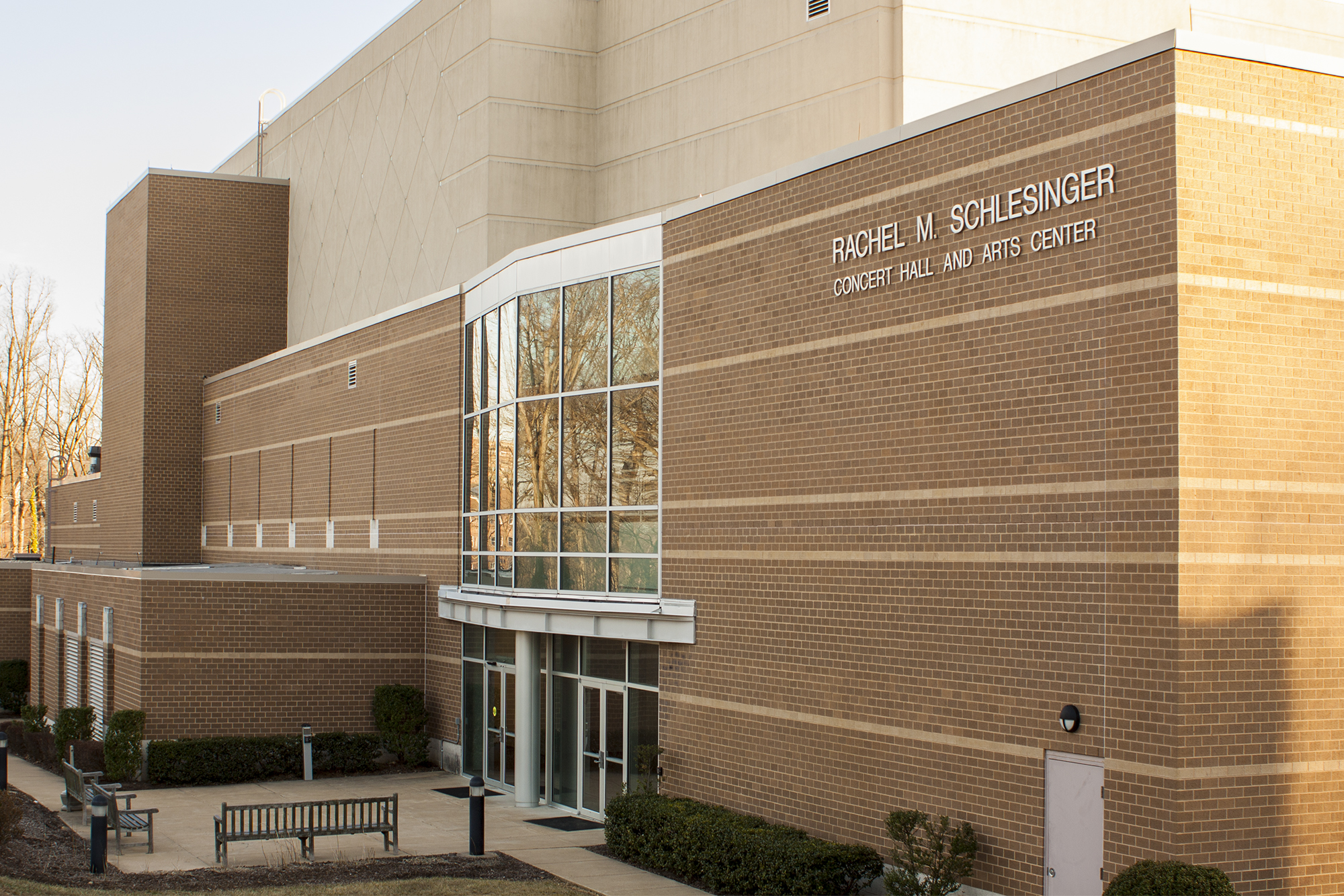
Rachel M. Schlesinger Concert Hall on the Alexandria Campus

The Alexandria Campus is located in Alexandria and primarily serves the residents of the City of Alexandria, Arlington County, Falls Church, and eastern Fairfax County. The campus grew from one building constructed on a 22.5-acre site in 1971 to three buildings on 51.4 acres in 1980. Additions to the original Bisdorf Building and the Engineering/Automotive Technology Building were opened in 1980. In that year, the John Tyler School was also purchased from the City of Alexandria and incorporated as part of the campus. The Alexandria Campus also maintains classrooms in leased facilities at off-campus locations. The Rachel M. Schlesinger Concert Hall and Arts Center was completed in 2001 and includes the 981-seat Mary Collier Baker Theater. In 2006, under the auspices of the Alexandria Campus, the Arlington Center opened for classes.

=== Annandale ===
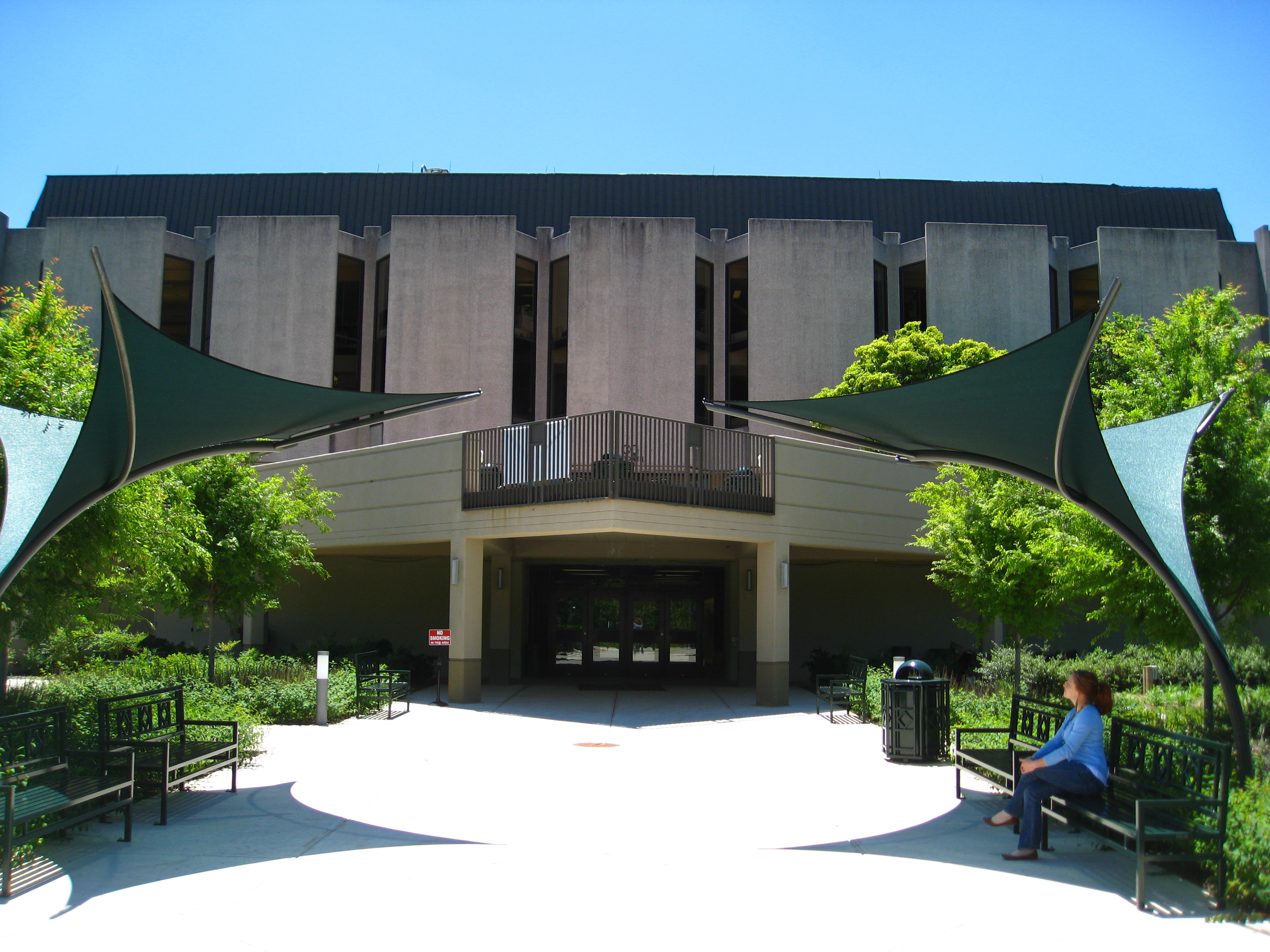
Charles Godwin Building on the Annandale campus

The Annandale Campus is located in central Fairfax County and primarily serves the residents of the county. The campus began as one building constructed in 1967 on a 78-acre site. In 1969, three additional buildings were erected and the TV/Technical Building followed in 1970. The Nursing Building was completed in 1972. The Brault Building, which houses college staff, was completed in 1984, and recent renovations were complete in 2015. The Richard J. Ernst Community Cultural Center, which serves the college and the community and includes a 525-seat auditorium, was completed in 1990. The MacDiarmid Building was completed in 1997. In Spring 2006, work was completed on a six-level, 825-space parking garage for faculty, staff, students, and visitors. The Student Services Building opened in 2011, and was renamed the Mark Warner Student Services Building after Virginia Senator Mark Warner in 2016. The Annandale Campus also provides off-campus instruction at various locations.

=== Loudoun ===
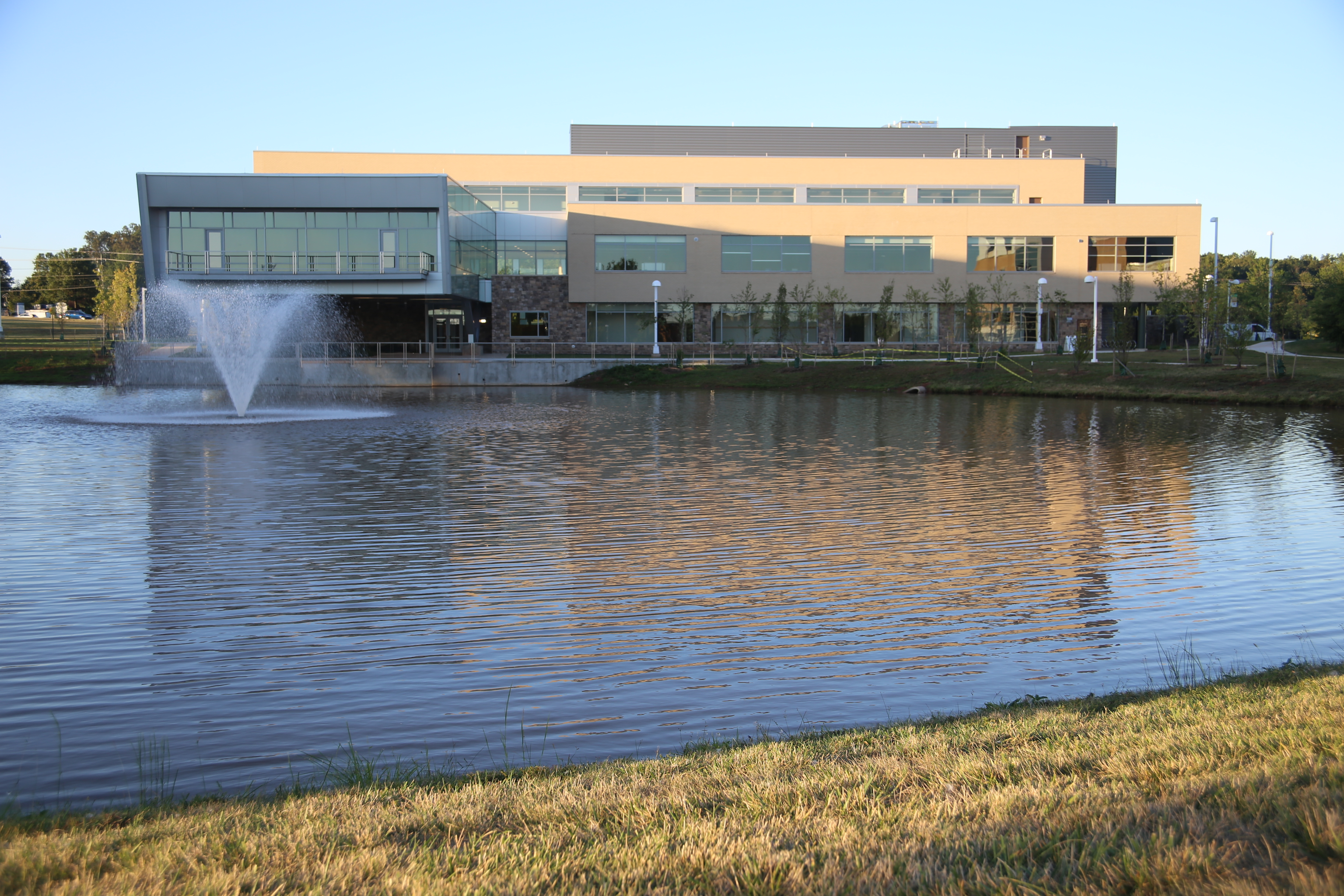
Central area of the Loudon campus

The Loudoun Campus is located in Sterling and primarily serves the residents of northern Fairfax County and Loudoun County. Construction began on a 91.4-acre site in 1972 and was completed in 1974 with four permanent buildings, the temporary Interior Design Building, and greenhouse/laboratories. Under the auspices of the Loudoun Campus, the Reston Center opened for classes in 2006 and the Signal Hill Center opened for classes in 2009. In 2012, the Learning Commons building opened at the Loudoun Campus. The Higher Education Center opened in 2015 and was renamed the Robert G. Templin Higher Education Center in 2016. The Loudoun Campus also maintains classrooms in leased off-campus facilities.

=== Manassas ===
The Manassas Campus is located in western Prince William County on a 100-acre site next to the Manassas National Battlefield. The campus primarily serves the residents of western Prince William and Fairfax counties and the cities of Manassas and Manassas Park. In 1999, the Mary Louise Jackson Amphitheater was opened. In 2008, under the auspices of the Manassas Campus, the Innovation Park location opened for classes. In 2012, the Harry J. Parrish Hall opened at the Manassas Campus.

=== Medical Education ===
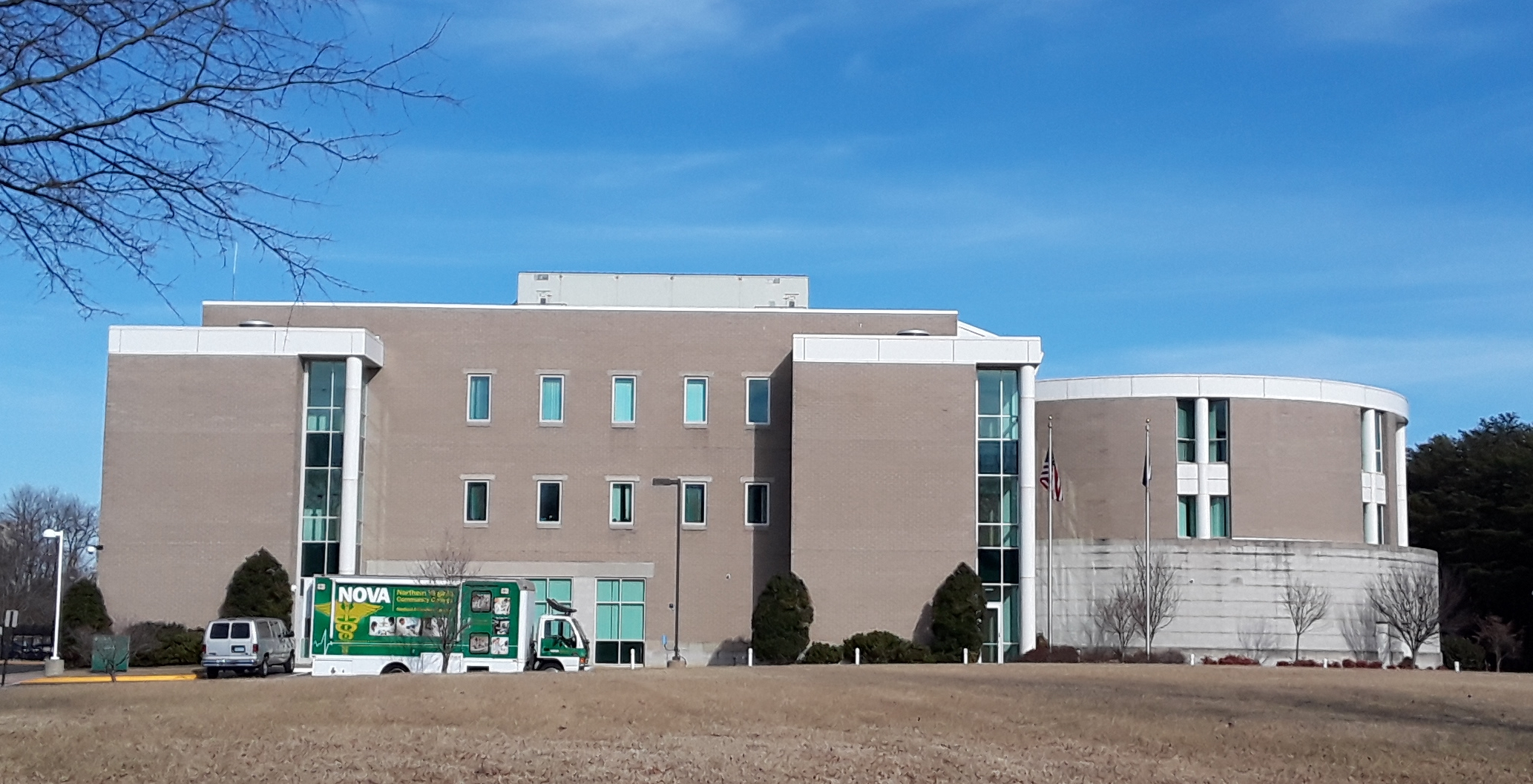
The Medical Education Campus in Springfield

The Medical Education Campus (MEC) opened in the Fall of 2003 in Springfield. The MEC is a collaborative effort between NOVA, George Mason University, Virginia Commonwealth University, and regional public school systems. The MEC offers many different health-related programs and has classrooms and laboratories, dental clinics, and a clinical practice site for nursing and allied health students. The MEC offers a special nursing program called Momentum 2+1 that specifically prepares graduates to transfer to the Bachelor of Science degree in nursing at George Mason University. The MEC is also a member of the NoVa HealthFORCE, an initiative of The Northern Virginia Health Care Workforce Alliance (NVHCW A), addressing issues in the Health Care profession.

=== Woodbridge ===
The Woodbridge Campus is located in eastern Prince William County and primarily serves the residents of the county. Classes were offered in temporary community facilities from 1972 through 1975. Campus construction began in 1974 on a 109-acre site. A four-story building was completed in 1975; Phase II of this building was completed in 1990. The campus has also added the heating, ventilation, and air conditioning buildings and several temporary facilities. In Fall 2013, the Woodbridge Campus opened the Arts and Science Building, and in 2015, unveiled the Regional Center for Workforce Education and Training. The Woodbridge Campus provides off-campus instruction at several locations, including area high schools and the Quantico and Fort Belvoir military bases.

== Athletics ==
NOVA started intercollegiate athletics in 2001 as a member of the National Junior College Athletic Association (NJCAA). The college sponsors women's volleyball, men's soccer, women's cross country, men's basketball, women's basketball, football, men's lacrosse, and softball at the intercollegiate varsity level. In addition, NOVA has a club ice hockey team that is a member of the American Collegiate Hockey Association (ACHA). NOVA added a varsity esports team in the Fall 2018 as a member of the National Association of Collegiate Esports (NACE).

The college introduced Ace the Nighthawk in 2017 as the first mascot of the modern era of NOVA Athletics.

NJCAA Region 20 Championships

- 2014 – Division III Women's Cross Country
- 2014 – Division II Women's Volleyball
- 2015 – Division I Women's Cross Country
- 2016 – Division I Women's Cross Country
- 2017 – Division I Women's Cross Country
- 2018 – Division II Women's Volleyball

The Nighthawks did not field teams during the COVID 19 pandemic, and returned for the 2022-23 school year. Following the 2023-24 basketball season, Dr. Anne Kress announced the school would no longer field NJCAA sports, leaving only Esports. Hockey was eliminated after the 2019-20 season.

== Notable alumni ==
- Carol Banawa, singer
- Candice Rose Martinez, bank robber
- Doug Mills, photojournalist
- Adam Parkhomenko, political strategist and organizer, former DNC National Field Director
- Ashley Wagner, figure skater
- Gerry Bertier, Paralympian
- Christina Hendricks, actress

== Notable faculty ==
- Jill Biden, English professor, former First Lady of the United States

== See also ==
- Northern Virginia Community College, Annandale
- Goodwill Scholarships
- George Mason University
