= Southside Virginia Community College =

Public college in Virginia, US

- Type: Public community college
- Established: January 24, 1970; 56 years ago
- Parent institution: Virginia Community College System
- President: Quentin R. Johnson
- Location: Virginia, United States
- Website: www.southside.edu

Southside Virginia Community College (SVCC) is a public community college with two campuses in Virginia, one near Alberta in Brunswick County, and the John H. Daniel Campus, just outside Keysville in Charlotte County. It is part of the Virginia Community College System. It was founded in 1970 and has the largest geographic service area of any community college in the state, covering 10 counties and the city of Emporia.

The college offers classes at a number of off-campus sites and online. Major off-campus locations include the Southside Virginia Education Center, in Emporia; Southern Virginia Higher Education Center, in South Boston; Estes Community Center, in Chase City; Lake Country Advanced Knowledge Center, South Hill; and the SVCC Occupational/Technical Center in Blackstone. Along with these major sites, SVCC has many smaller off-campus sites scattered throughout its service region that serve a large number of students.

Alfred A. Roberts served as the president of SVCC from 2014 until his retirement. He was succeeded in 2019 by Dr Quentin R. Johnson, the sixth president of the college.

== Locations ==
Southside Virginia Community College has two main campuses and five off-campus centers.

=== Alberta ===
Christanna Campus 109 Campus Drive, Alberta, Virginia 23821

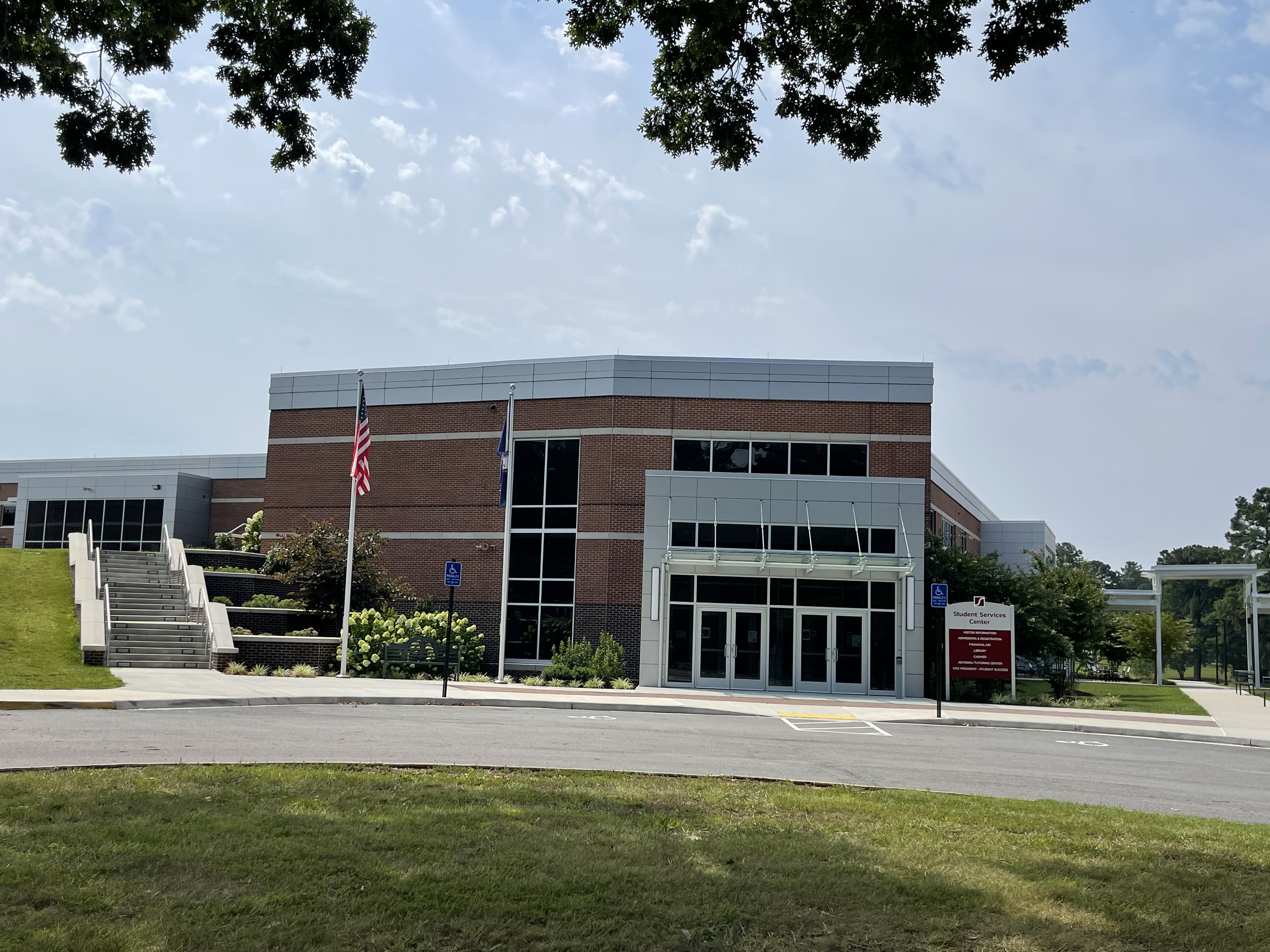
SVCC Christanna Campus Student Services Center Alberta Virginia 2022

During a period from 1966 to 1968, a committee composed of local business, civic, industrial, and political leaders were appointed by the governing bodies of counties and cities in Region 20 for the purpose of promoting and establishing campuses where needed. In 1968, the plan for building the Christanna Campus of Southside Virginia Community College near Alberta, Virginia, was approved by the State Board for Community Colleges, and appropriations were made for its construction. The local advisory board for the college was established in July 1969. The Christanna Campus was opened in September 1970 with approximately 55,600 square feet, located on over 100 acres.

=== Keysville ===
John H. Daniel Campus 200 Daniel Road, Keysville, Virginia 23947

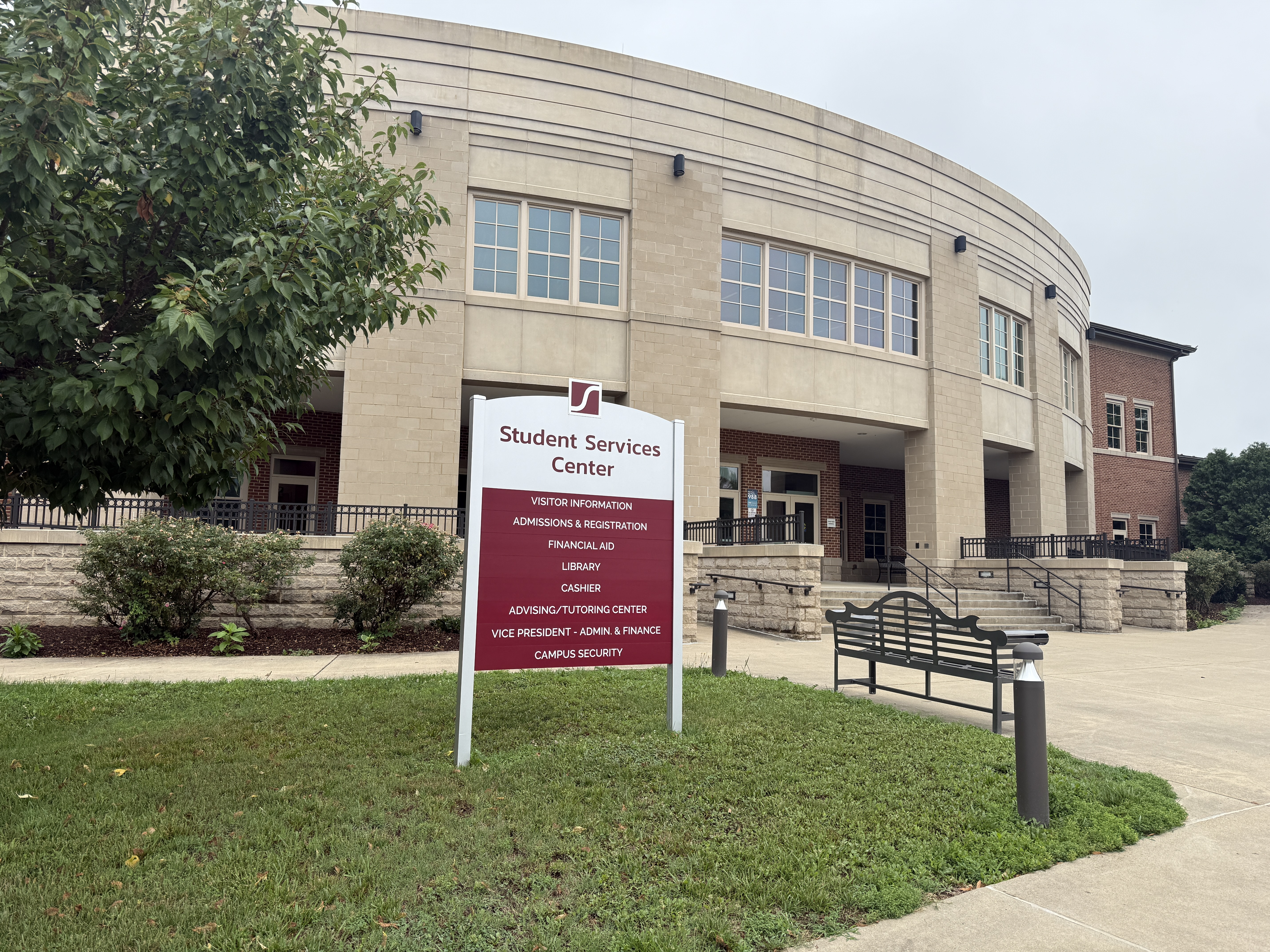
SVCC Daniel Campus Student Services Center 2026

Due to the extremely large service area assigned to the college, the John H. Daniel Campus was opened in September 1971 near Keysville, Virginia, about 40 miles northwest of Alberta. The Student Services Center on the John H. Daniel Campus opened in 2014. This 37,100 square foot facility houses the library, student development and financial aid services, admissions and records, the business office, and a student lounge.

=== Blackstone ===
Occupational Technical Center/ Pickett Park 1041 W. 10th Street, Blackstone, Virginia 23824

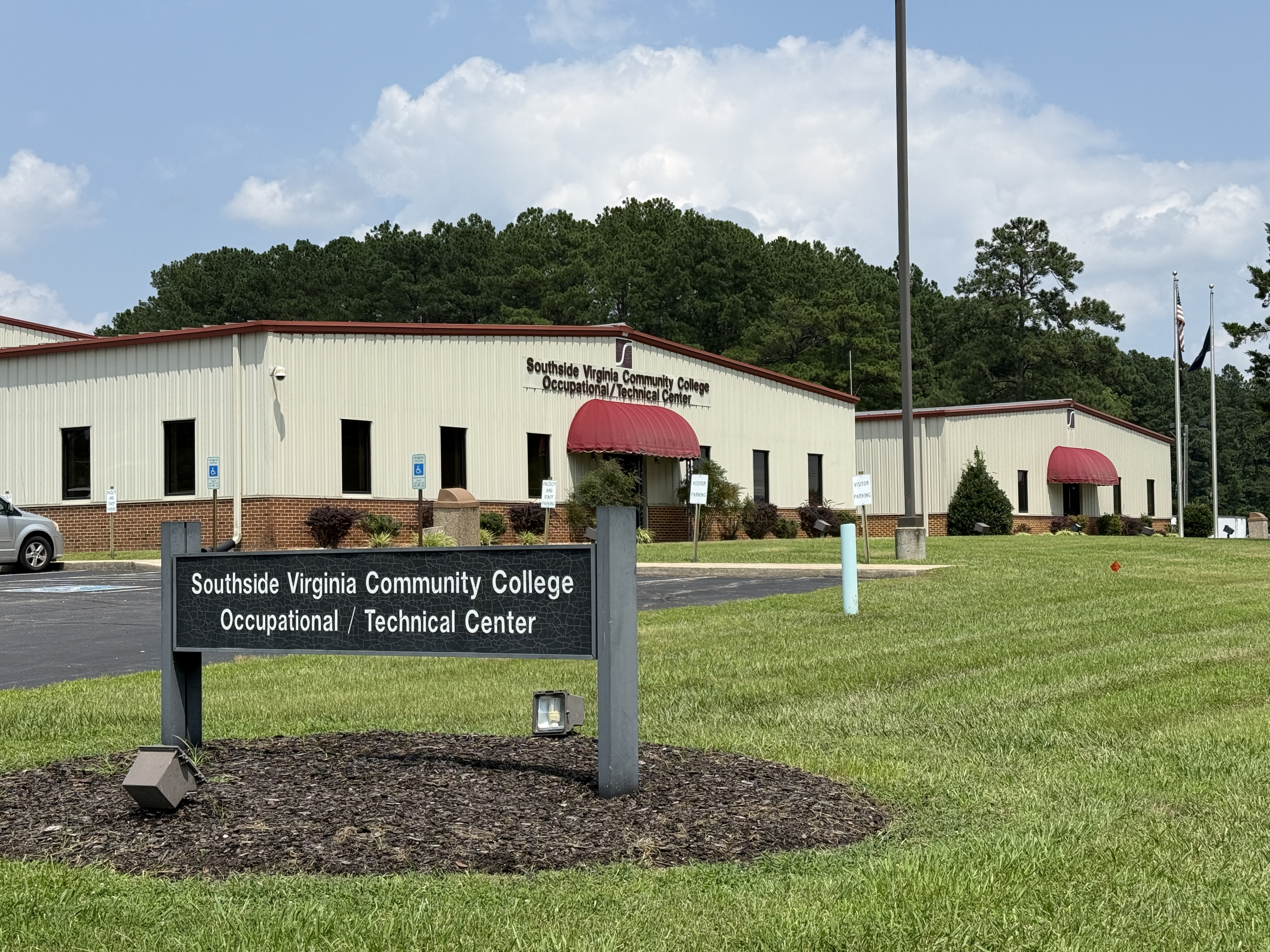
SVCC Occupational Technical Center Blackstone 2026

The Occupational Technical Center at Pickett Park, Blackstone, is a facility built through the SVCC Foundation using Tobacco Region Revitalization Commission funds. The facility houses the college’s Truck Driver Training Program, Diesel Mechanics/Technicians Training Program, SHINE Solar Training, Fiber Technician Training, and the Power Line Worker Program.

=== Chase City ===
Estes Community Center 316 N. Main Street, Chase City, Virginia 23924

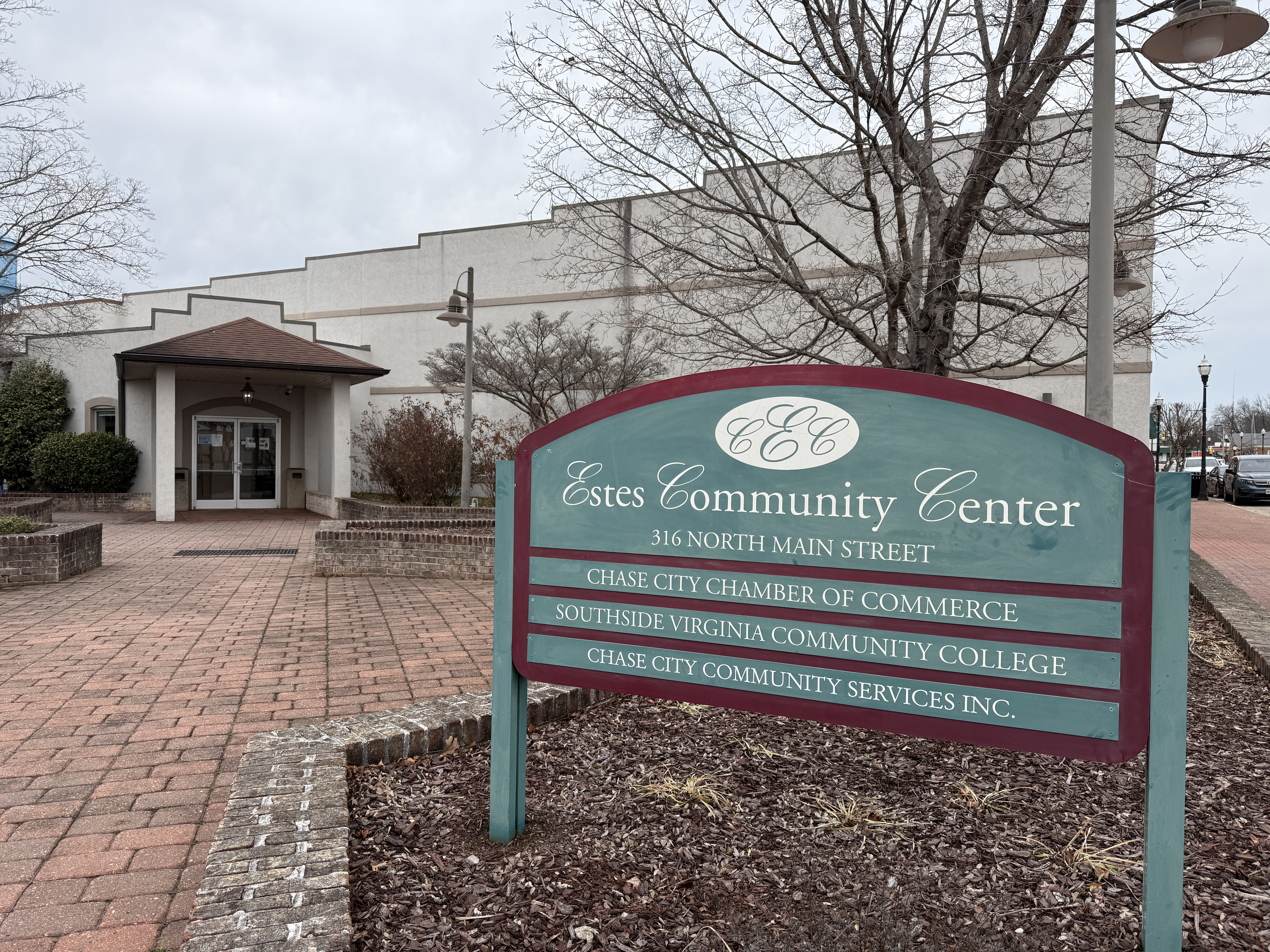
SVCC Estes Community Center

The Estes Community Center, located on Main Street in Chase City, is another example of the community banding together to provide opportunities for its citizens. The Estes family offered to match as much as $200,000 raised by the community within a 90-day period, but it exceeded that figure by raising $390,000. An addition to the existing facility, The Garland Building, was completed in January 2007, adding an additional 18,000 square feet to the facility.

The center offers SVCC classes and has a fully equipped computer lab, cosmetology lab, and nursing simulation lab. Dual Enrollment, cosmetology, nursing, EMS, and Workforce classes are an essential part of this center. It also offers programs for children and has a large area available for rent for special events and occasions.

=== Emporia ===
Southside Virginia Education Center 1300 Greensville County Circle, Suite A, Emporia, Virginia 23847

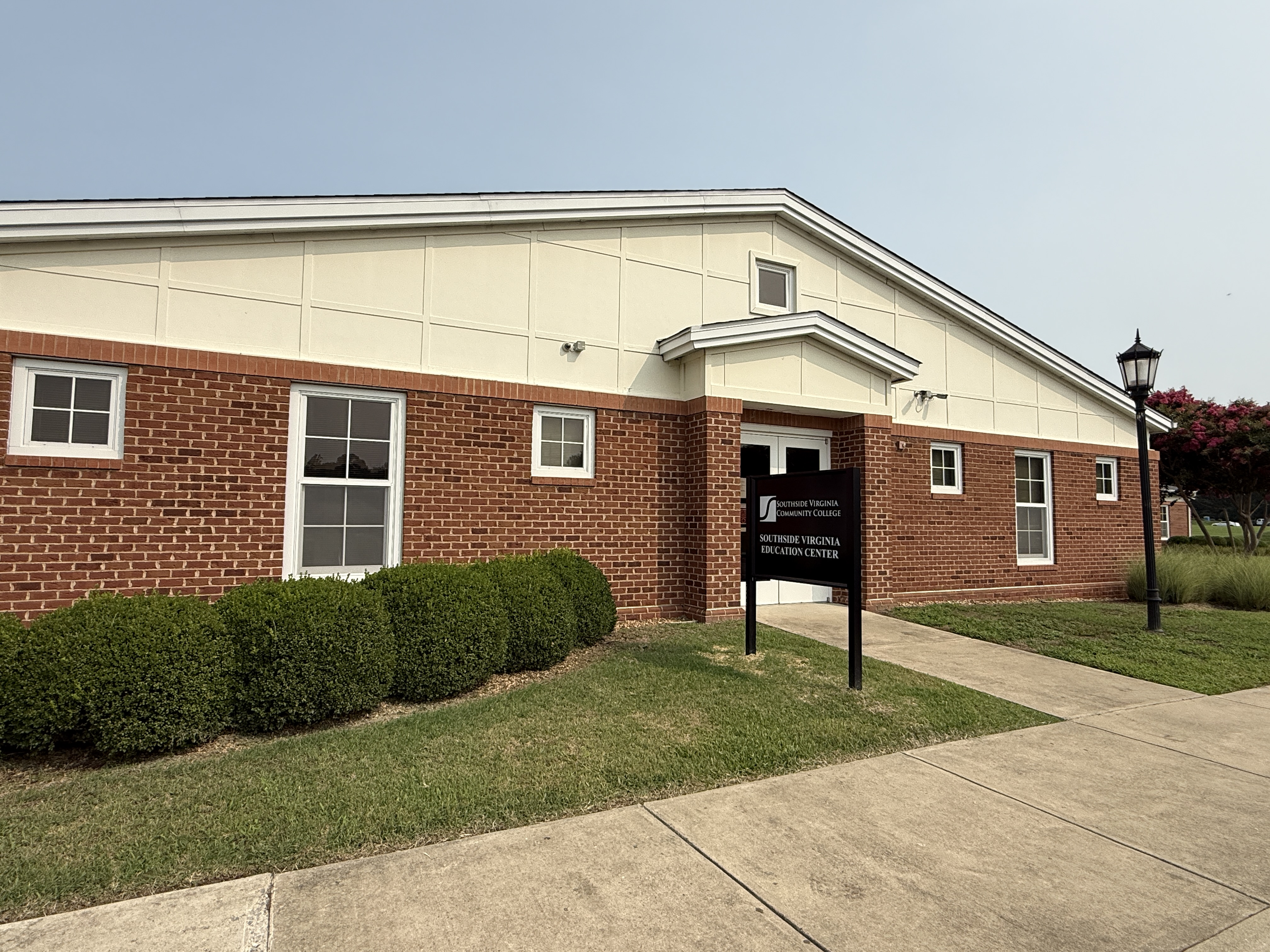
SVCC Southside Virginia Education Center Emporia 2026

In September 1985, SVCC opened its Campus Without Walls, which was renamed the Robert C. Wrenn Campus Without Walls in October 1992. This facility allows Emporia and Greensville County residents to enroll in continuing education programs that develop and strengthen job skills as well as working towards certificate, diploma, and degree programs offered by the college, and participating in community service program offerings. A new facility, the Southside Virginia Education Center, opened at 1300 Greensville Circle, Emporia, in the fall of 2008.

=== South Boston ===
Southern Virginia Higher Education Center 820 Bruce Street, South Boston, Virginia 24592

Founded in 1986, the Southern Virginia Higher Education Center (SVHEC) began in a small trailer beside Halifax County High School with just three employees: Earl and Deborah McDaniel and Sheila Coleman. Classes were initially held at the high school, giving local students access to higher education without traveling to distant campuses. As enrollment quickly grew, SVHEC relocated to the former Lowe’s building and later, in 2001, moved to its current home at 820 Bruce Street -a renovated tobacco warehouse donated by the families of Bob Harris and John Cannon. The facility now includes 21 classrooms and a renovated Student Learning Resource Center that supports student collaboration and academic success.

Today, SVHEC partners with Southside Virginia Community College and other institutions to provide academic and workforce training programs. The Healthcare Training Hub features advanced simulation labs for nursing students, while the Information Technology Academy and Innovation Center offer hands-on training in IT, welding, industrial maintenance, and robotics. The Career Tech Academy, launched in 2019, provides dual-enrollment workforce programs for high school students. Since its founding, SVHEC has transformed thousands of lives by expanding access to higher education and career training throughout Southern Virginia.

=== South Hill ===
Lake Country Advanced Knowledge Center 118 E Danville Street, South Hill, Virginia 23970

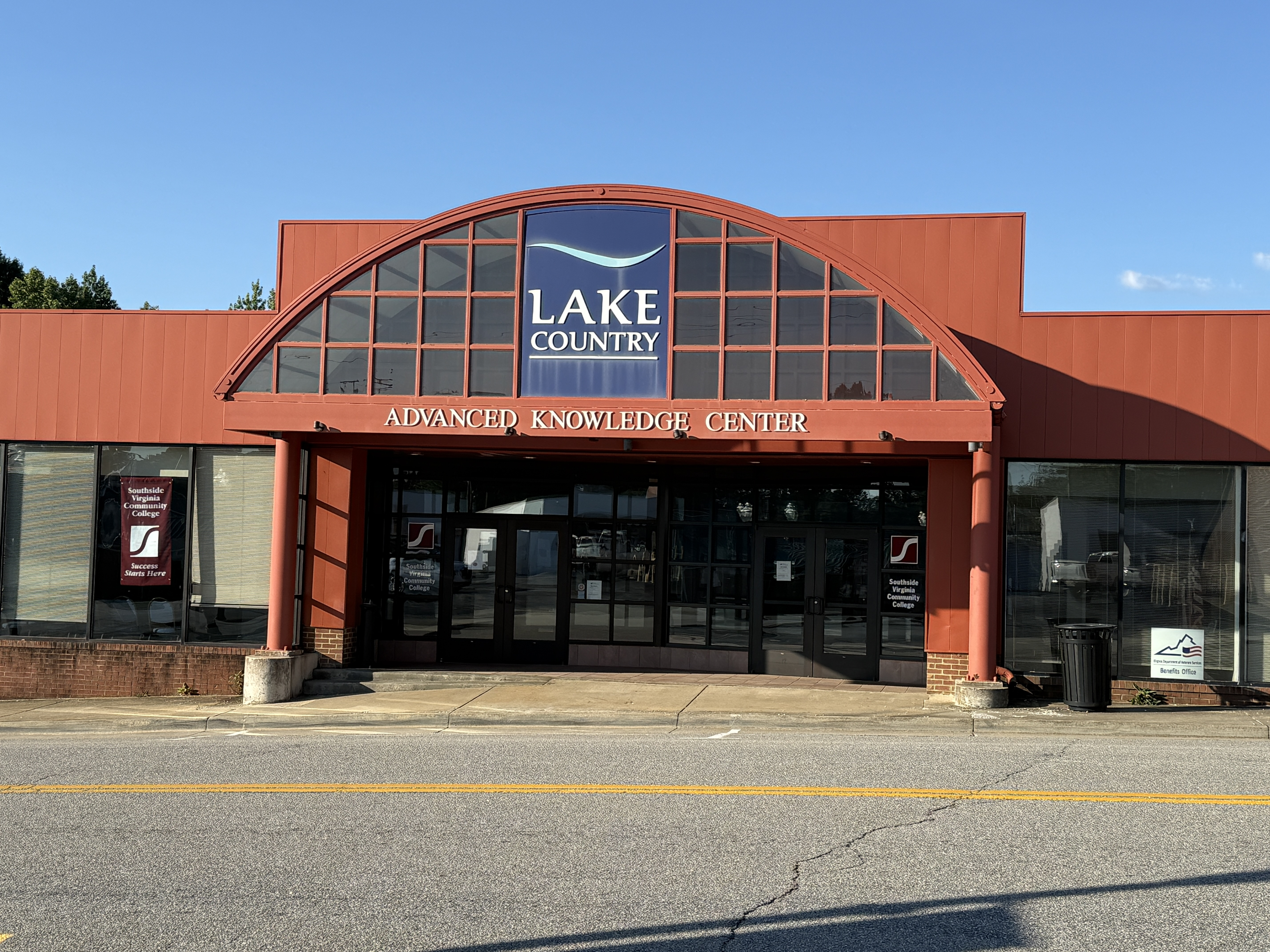
SVCC Lake Country Advanced Knowledge Center South Hill Virginia

Lake Country Advanced Knowledge Center is located in the center of South Hill, VA. The 23,000-square-foot facility is home to education and workforce training aligned with regional employment needs and supports both new and existing businesses and industries. Training focuses on high-demand fields such as HVAC, Electrical, and Welding, along with customized workforce training developed in partnership with employers. Academic and foundational learning includes traditional college coursework, dual-enrollment opportunities, GED preparation, computer skills development, and access to a cyber café that supports learning and connectivity.

The center also houses the Center for Information Technology Excellence (CITE), home to the SVCC Microsoft Datacenter Academy (DCA), which offers training pathways for careers as Data Center Technicians, Critical Environment Technicians, and Logistics Technicians.
