= Central Virginia Community College =

College in Lynchburg, Virginia, U.S.

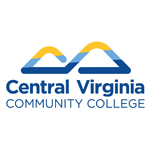
- Official logo of CVCC.
- Motto: Where your future begins.
- Type: Public community college
- Established: 1966
- Parent institution: Virginia Community College System
- President: John S. Capps
- Students: 5,500
- Location: Lynchburg, Virginia, United States; 37°21′19.31″N 79°11′2.58″W
- Website: www.centralvirginia.edu

Central Virginia Community College (CVCC) is a public community college in Lynchburg, Virginia. It is part of the Virginia Community College System. Established in 1966, CVCC serves students at the main campus in Lynchburg or at one of its off-site centers in Amherst, Appomattox, Bedford, and Campbell counties.

== Students ==
For the 2017-2018 semesters, CVCC's total headcount was 5,652 students, 55% female, 45% male. The racial makeup of the student body was:

Ethnicity	Students	Percentage
American Indian	26	0.5%
Asian	142	2.5%
Black	1,021	18.1%
Hawaiian/Pacific Islander	5	0.1%
Hispanic	195	3.5%
Multi-racial	245	4.3%
Not Specified/Unknown	45	0.8%
White	3,973	70.2%

== Academics and programs ==
Central Virginia Community College offers 80 associate degree and career certificate programs.
