= Virginia Community College System =

List of 23 community colleges in Virginia

- Type: Public university system
- Established: December 16, 1966; 59 years ago
- Chancellor: David Doré
- Students: 218,985; 95,592 (on an FTE basis)
- Website: www.vccs.edu

The Virginia Community College System (VCCS) oversees a network of 23 community colleges in Virginia, which serve residents of Virginia and provide two-year degrees and various specialty training and certifications. In 2006, the Virginia Community College System's annual enrollment rate topped 233,000 students. The VCCS also had an additional 170,000 students in workforce development services and noncredit courses.

In March 2022, the system hired Russell Kavalhuna as its next chancellor.

In June 2022, the board announced that Kavalhuna was no longer taking the job and the system was restarting the search for a new chancellor. Sharon Morrissey, previously the system's vice chancellor for academic and workforce programs, was appointed interim chancellor.

On January 4, 2023, Virginia's Community Colleges announced that David Doré would be the next chancellor of the system. He began his role on April 1, 2023.

== Colleges ==
Location of VCCS campuses. For colleges with multiple campuses, the largest campus is labeled.

VCCS institutions
Name	Established	Enrollment	Location
Blue Ridge Community College	1967	3,386	Augusta County
Brightpoint Community College	1967	8,558	Chesterfield County
Central Virginia Community College	1966	3,464	Lynchburg
Danville Community College	1936	2,330	Danville
Eastern Shore Community College	1971	637	Accomack County
Germanna Community College	1970	7,496	Culpeper County; Fredericksburg; Orange County; Stafford County
J. Sargeant Reynolds Community College	1972	7,252	Richmond
Laurel Ridge Community College	1970	5,862	Fauquier County; Frederick County; Page County
Mountain Empire Community College	1972	2,079	Wise County
Mountain Gateway Community College	1962	1,069	Alleghany County
New River Community College	1959	3,903	Pulaski County
Northern Virginia Community College	1965	49,559	Alexandria; Fairfax County; Loudoun County; Manassas; Prince William County
Patrick & Henry Community College	1962	1,906	Henry County
Paul D. Camp Community College	1970	1,239	Franklin
Piedmont Virginia Community College	1972	4,997	Charlottesville
Rappahannock Community College	1970	2,588	Gloucester County; Richmond County
Southside Virginia Community College	1970	2,961	Brunswick County; Charlotte County
Southwest Virginia Community College	1968	2,135	Tazewell County
Tidewater Community College	1968	16,797	Chesapeake; Norfolk; Portsmouth; Suffolk; Virginia Beach
Virginia Highlands Community College	1967	2,451	Washington County
Virginia Peninsula Community College	1968	5,832	Hampton; James City County; Newport News; Williamsburg
Virginia Western Community College	1966	5,625	Roanoke
Wytheville Community College	1963	2,089	Wythe County
