= Piedmont Virginia Community College =

Public college in Charlottesville, Virginia, US

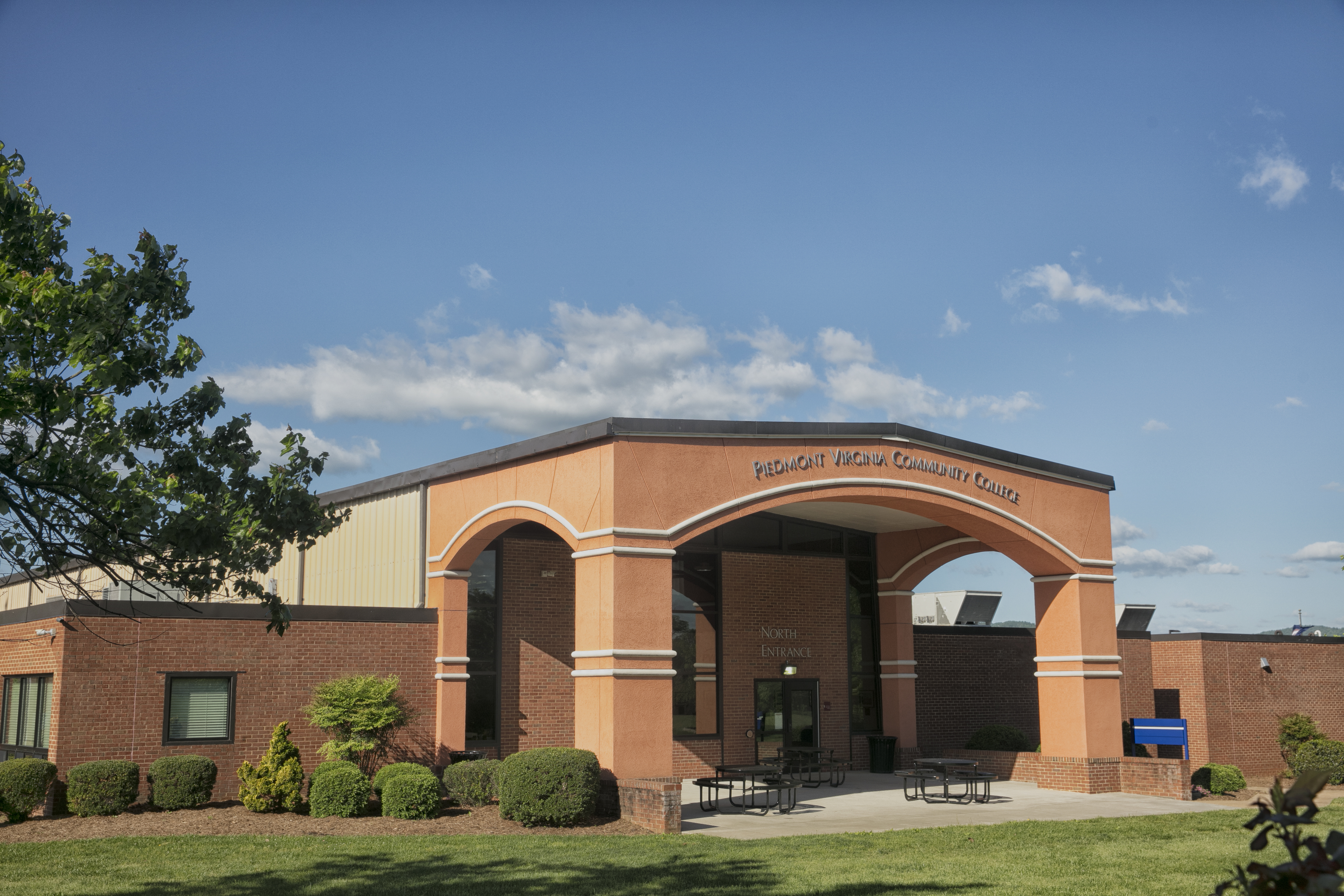
- North entrance of the Main Building on campus
- Type: Public community college
- Established: 1972
- Parent institution: VCCS
- Accreditation: SACSCOC
- President: Jean Runyon
- Students: 5,312 (fall 2019)
- Location: Charlottesville, Virginia, United States; 38.0063054°N 78.4848792°W
- Campus: Suburban
- Colors
- Nickname: Panthers
- Mascot: Pouncer the Panther
- Website: www.pvcc.edu
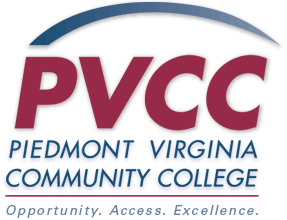

Piedmont Virginia Community College (PVCC) is a public community college in Charlottesville, Virginia. It offers associate degrees, certificates, continuing education, and workforce training. The campus is located in Albemarle County, Virginia, south of Charlottesville. As part of the statewide Virginia Community College System, PVCC serves the City of Charlottesville and the counties of Albemarle, Buckingham, Fluvanna, Greene, Louisa, and Nelson. PVCC was chartered in 1972. PVCC has been accredited since 1974 by the Commission on Colleges of the Southern Association of Colleges and Schools to award associate degrees.

== Locations ==
PVCC's main campus is 501 College Drive in Charlottesville, Virginia. It consists of the Main Building, the V. Earl Dickinson Building for Humanities and Social Sciences, the Keats Science Building, the Stultz Center for Business and Career Development, and the Woodrow W. Bolick Advanced Technology and Student Success Center. Which mostly consists of manufacturing classrooms, offices for staff, and student spaces on the third floor.

PVCC opened a center in Stanardsville, Virginia, in August 2012. The PVCC Eugene Giuseppe Center occupies the second floor of the Greene County Library building and holds classrooms, labs, a community meeting room, and other facilities. The college began offering classes there in the fall of 2012.

PVCC also opened a center in downtown Charlottesville, Virginia, in January 2013. PVCC is housed on the ground floor in the historic Jefferson School building. The college offers day and evening classes at this facility and has introduced a new associate degree program in culinary arts hosted there since 2013.

== Student body ==
In 2020, PVCC enrolled 5,684 undergraduates, 79% part-time.

== Academics ==
PVCC offers degrees and certificates to complete in two years or less, as well as degrees that prepare students for transfer to four-year schools to complete a bachelor's degree. Associate degrees generally take two years of full-time study to complete and require 60–72 credit hours. Certificates and Career Studies Certificates require 9–46 credit hours and one or two semesters to complete.

== Gallery ==
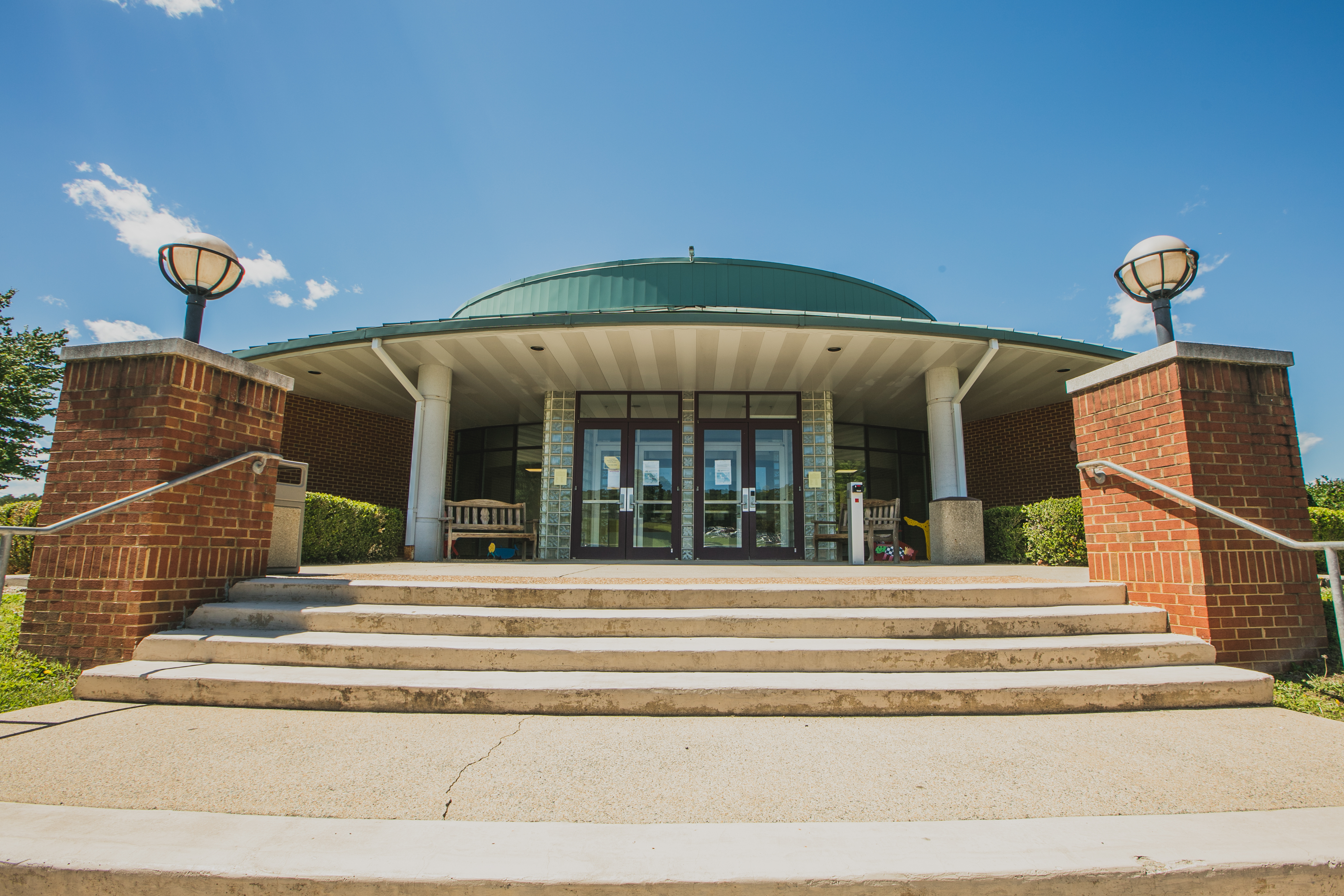
Dickinson Building

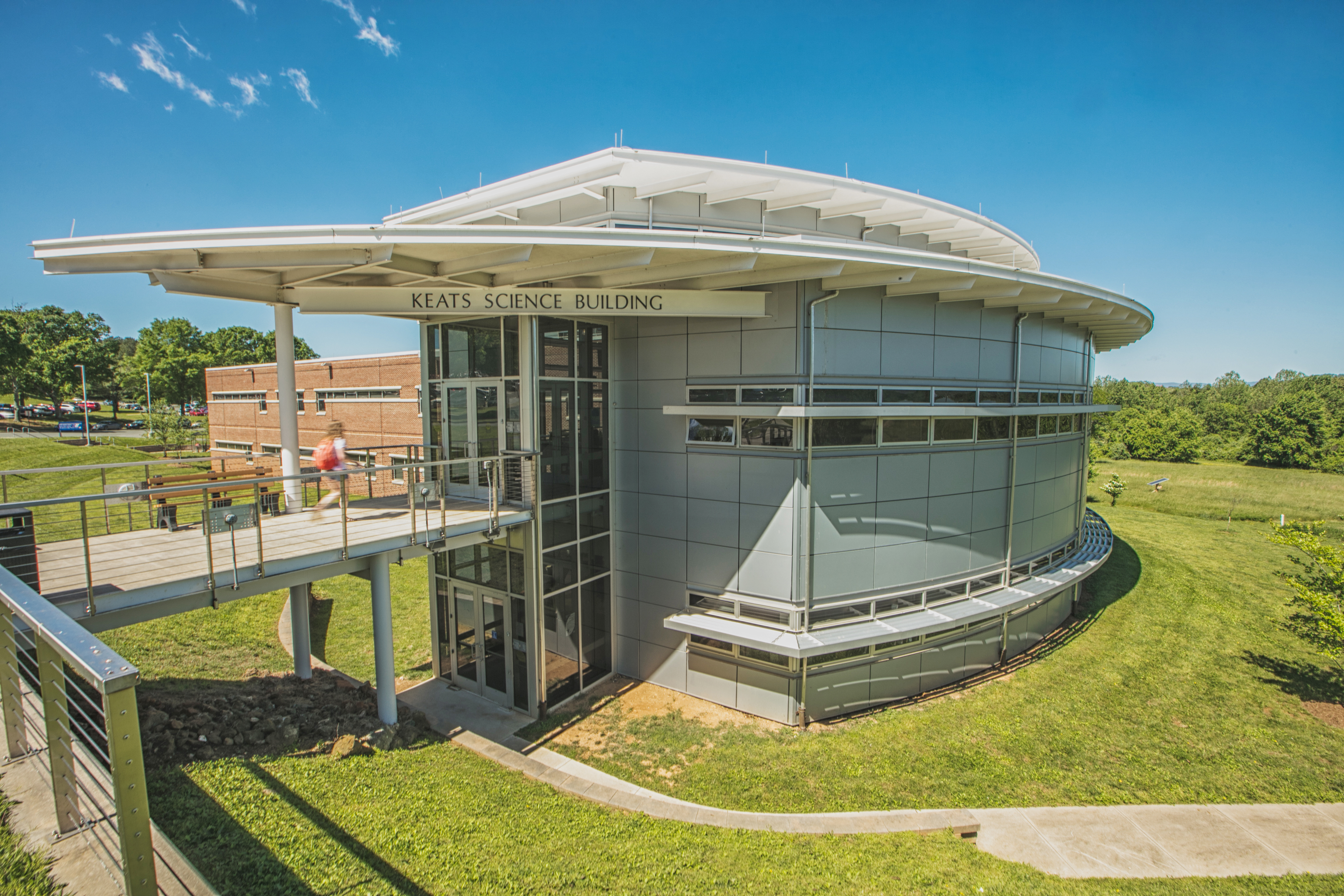
Keats Science Building

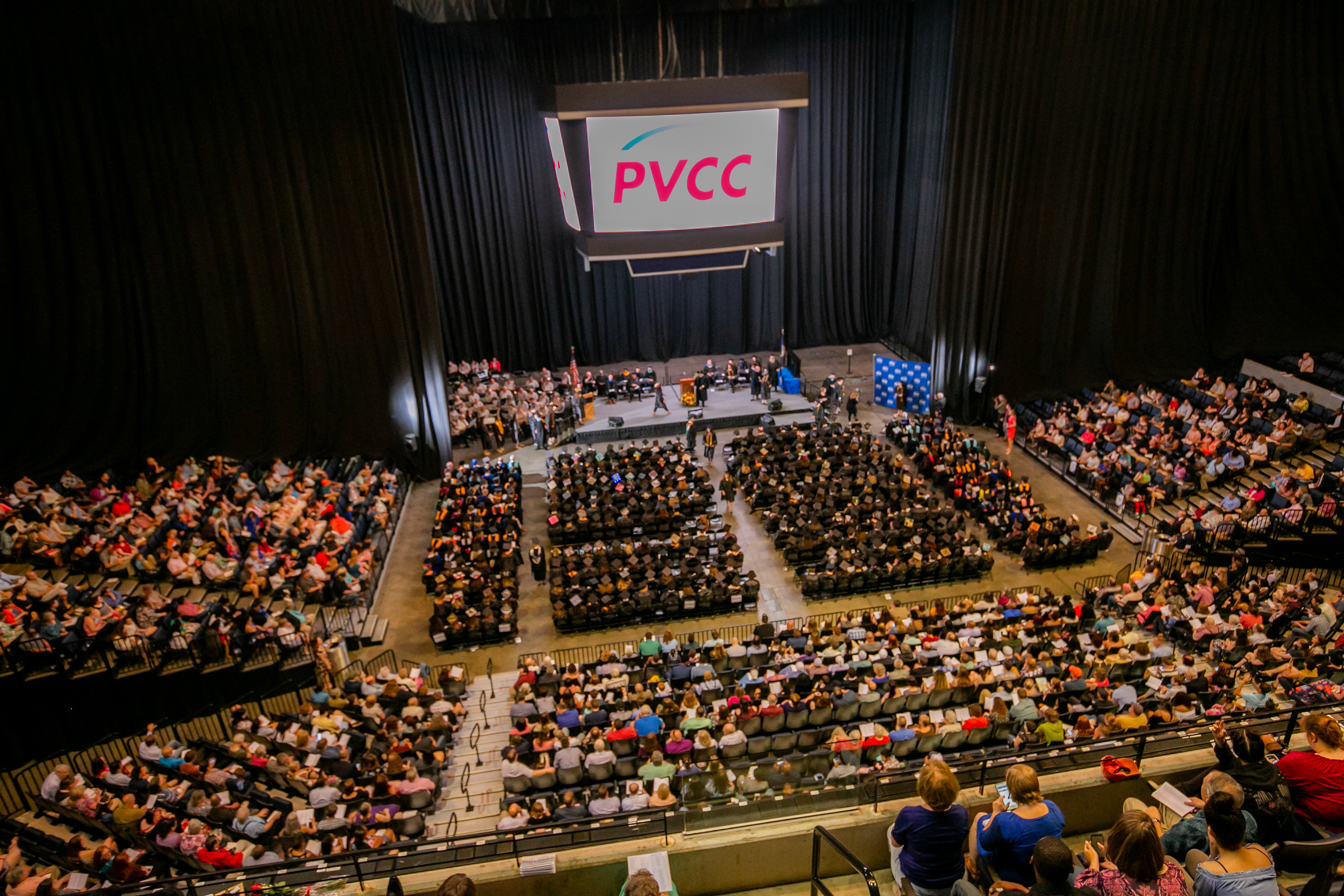
Commencement, 2018
