= Paul D. Camp Community College =

Community college in Franklin, Virginia, US

Coordinates: 36.674499°N 76.937649°W

- Type: Community College
- Established: 1970; 56 years ago
- President: Corey L. McCray
- Location: Franklin, Suffolk, and Isle of Wight, Virginia, United States
- Website: www.pdc.edu

Paul D. Camp Community College (PDCCC) is a public community college in Franklin, Virginia. Founded in 1970, it is one of 23 schools in the Virginia Community College System. The college is named after a local advocate of education, who, along with his brothers, founded the lumber business, Camp Manufacturing Company. The college was built on land donated by Camp's daughters almost 50 years after his death.

Paul D. Camp Community College has campuses in Franklin and Suffolk, Virginia (Hobbs Suffolk Campus) as well as a center in the town of Smithfield, Virginia. The Franklin Campus opened in fall 1971. Classes were offered in Suffolk as early as 1979. However, the current building on Kenyon Road was not erected until 1995. The Smithfield Center began its operations in 1993. PDCCC serves the cities of Franklin and Suffolk, and the counties of Southampton and Isle of Wight.

PDCCC offers day and evening classes, credit and non-credit workforce services and training for area businesses and industries through the college's Regional Workforce Development Center on the Franklin Campus, dual enrollment courses for high school students, and a growing number of online classes.
