= Virginia Highlands Community College =

Public college in Abingdon, Virginia, US

Coordinates: 36°41′57.3″N 82°0′5″W

- Type: Public community college
- Established: 1967
- Parent institution: Virginia Community College System
- Location: Abingdon, Virginia, United States
- Campus: Rural
- Mascot: Wolf
- Website: www.vhcc.edu

Virginia Highlands Community College is a public community college in Abingdon, Virginia, United States. It is part of the Virginia Community College System. The college was established November 30, 1967 to serve the residents of Washington County, western Smyth County, and the city of Bristol. Over 3,000 students are enrolled each semester.

== Notable alumni ==
- Doug Blevins, 1985, college football coach who was born with cerebral palsy
- Richard Leigh, 1973, songwriter
