= Brightpoint Community College =

Public college in Chester, Virginia, US

- Logo of the school
- Former name: John Tyler Community College (1967–2022)
- Motto: "A success story for every student."
- Type: Public community college
- Established: 1967; 59 years ago
- Parent institution: Virginia Community College System
- Accreditation: SACS
- Academic affiliations: SCHEV
- Endowment: $3.8 million (2019)
- President: William C. Fiege
- Students: 13,980 (2013–2014)
- Location: Chester, Virginia, United States; 37°20′43″N 77°24′27″W
- Campus: Suburban
- Other campuses: Midlothian, Virginia
- Colors: Coral and blue
- Nickname: Trailblazers
- Website: www.brightpoint.edu

Brightpoint Community College, formerly John Tyler Community College, is a public community college in central Virginia. It has two campuses: one in Chester, Virginia, and one in Midlothian, Virginia.

== History ==
Former seal of the school

The college opened in 1967 and was named after John Tyler, the tenth president of the United States and a Virginian. In July 2021, the Virginia State Board of Community Colleges renamed local institutions formerly named for enslavers or segregationists. The board allowed the college to rename itself Brightpoint Community College. Instead of venerating Tyler, a slave holder who sided with the Confederacy during the Civil War, officials said the name "celebrates the heart and energy of our institution". Additionally, names were redesignated for campus buildings and streets, including Bird Hall and Godwin Hall, both of which are named after Virginia politicians who supported racial segregation.

== Academics ==
The college is accredited by the Commission on Colleges of the Southern Association of Colleges and Schools and offers 17 associate degree programs, eight certificate programs, and 36 career studies certificate programs. In addition, the college has transfer degree programs that transfer into bachelor's degree programs that are mainly first- and second-year-student level classes. During the 2023–2024 academic year, the college served 12,097 students. The institution also serves 15,000 non-credit students and more than 1,000 companies and government agencies annually through the Community College Workforce Alliance. John Tyler is the first college in the Virginia Community College System to be recognized for its sustainability efforts. In July 2010, it received a Leadership in Energy and Environmental Design (LEED) Silver Certification for its Midlothian Campus Science Building.

== Locations ==
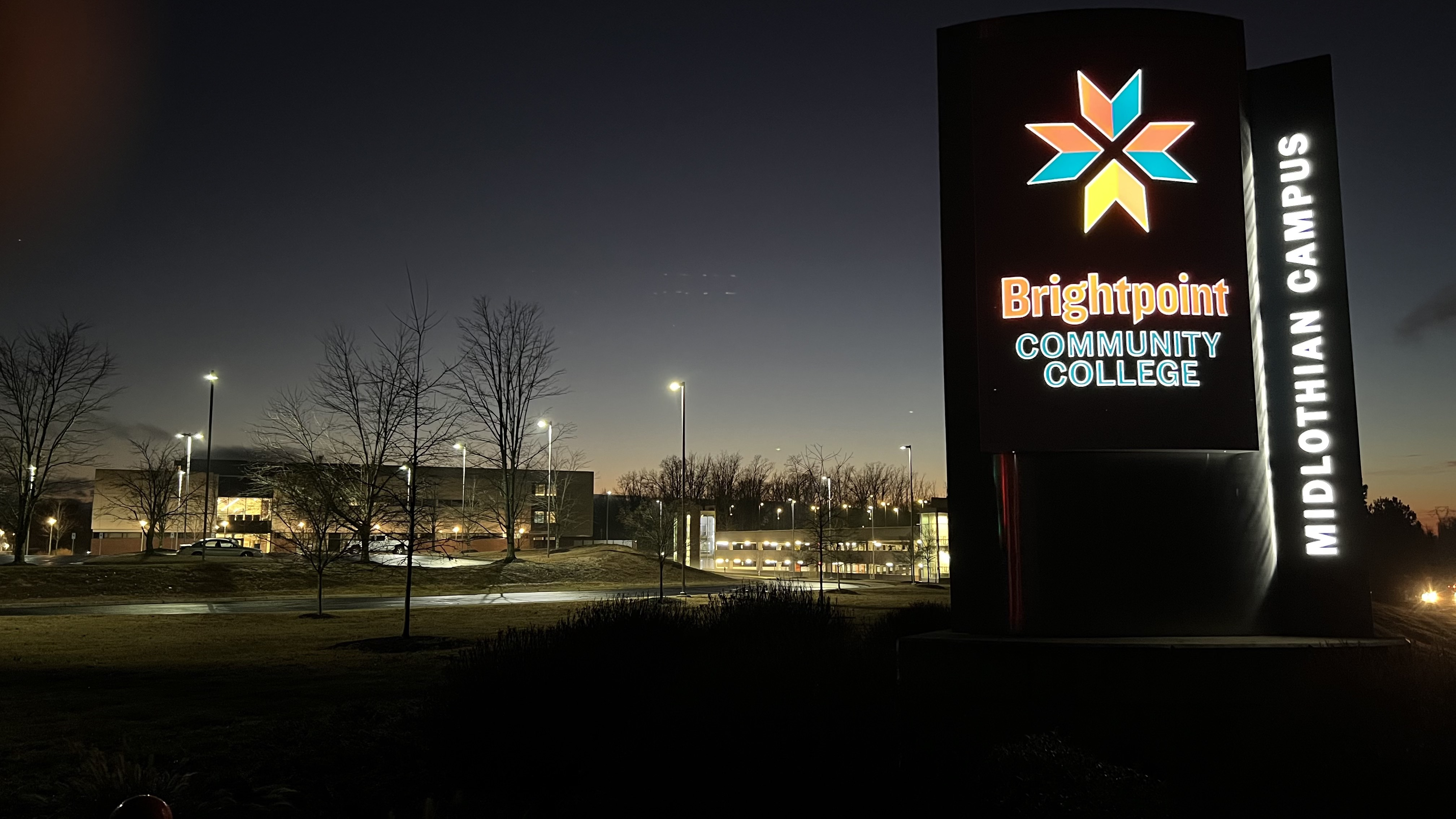
Brightpoint Community College, Midlothian campus.

The Community College has two campuses – one in Chester, Virginia, and one in Midlothian, Virginia. The college's Nursing Education Center is located on the Johnston-Willis Campus of CJW Medical Center.

It serves the cities of Colonial Heights, Hopewell, and Petersburg and the counties of Amelia, Charles City, Chesterfield, Dinwiddie, Prince George, Surry, and Sussex.
