= Laurel Ridge Community College =

Public college in the Shenandoah Valley of Virginia, US

Coordinates: 39.0362234°N 78.267952°W

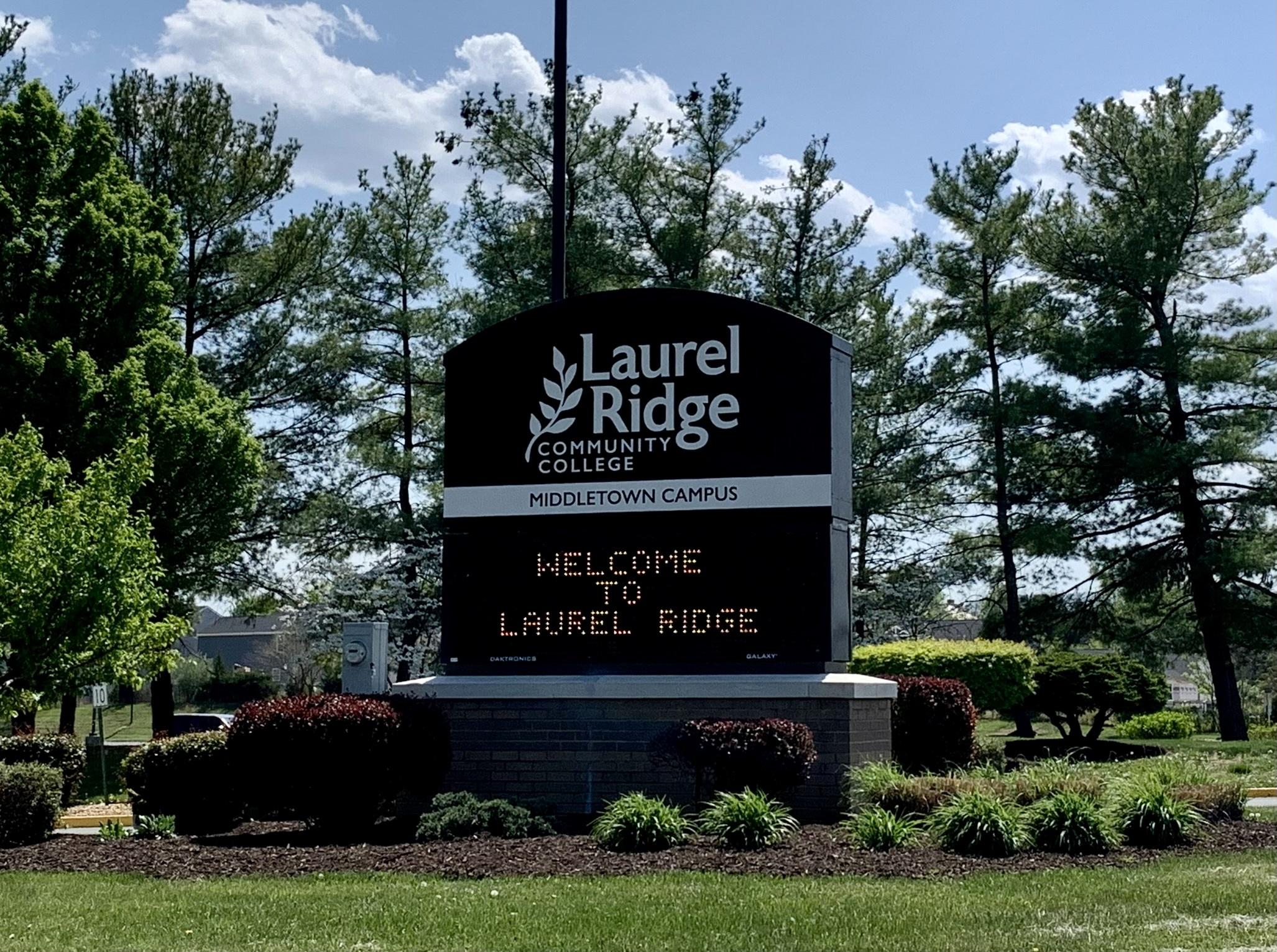
- Former name: Lord Fairfax Community College
- Type: Public community college
- Established: January 24, 1970; 56 years ago
- Parent institution: Virginia Community College System
- President: Kimberly Blosser
- Location: Middletown, Virginia, United States
- Campus Locations: Luray, Middletown, Warrenton
- Primary Jurisdictions Served: Clarke, Fauquier, Frederick, Page, Rappahannock, Shenandoah, Warren, Winchester
- Website: laurelridge.edu
- Location within Shenandoah Valley Location within Northern Virginia Location within Virginia Location within the United States

Laurel Ridge Community College, formerly Lord Fairfax Community College, is a public community college with multiple campuses in the Shenandoah Valley and Piedmont regions of Virginia. It is part of the Virginia Community College System and operates four locations — the Fauquier and Middletown Campuses, the Luray-Page County Center, and a site at Vint Hill in eastern Fauquier County — that serve seven counties and one city in the area, enrolling 5,862 students in academic year 2021–2022. Students attending Laurel Ridge can obtain an associate degree or certificate.

== History ==
The institutition was founded as Lord Fairfax Community College. The first president was William McCoy who served from 1970 until 1989. The second president was Marilyn Beck from 1990 through 2002. She was followed by John Sygielski from 2003 until May 2008. Cheryl Thompson-Stacy became the fourth president in January 2009 and was succeeded by Kimberly Blosser in April 2019.

In July 2021, the Virginia State Board of Community Colleges changed names for local institutions named after people who owned slaves or advocated racist policies such as school segregation. The board allowed the college to change its name to from Lord Fairfax Community College to Laurel Ridge Community College. Instead of venerating Thomas Fairfax, 6th Lord Fairfax of Cameron, plantation owner, the new name honors both the native mountain laurel and the classical laurel, the latter associated with academic achievement.

== Campuses and facilities ==

=== Middletown Campus ===
Laurel Ridge's original campus in Middletown has grown with the expansion of Cornerstone Hall, and the construction of Alson H. Smith Hall, the Corron Community Development Center, the Science and Health Professions Building, and most recently, the Student Union Building.

=== Fauquier Campus ===
In 1988, a second campus was opened in Fauquier County. That campus has undergone major expansions, with construction continuing.

In 2022, Hazel Hall, a science, engineering and health professions building, was opened and construction begun on a Center for Skilled Trades, which opened in September, 2023.

=== Luray-Page County Center ===
Laurel Ridge expanded their reach in 2006 to bring college classes to Luray. The original space on Hawksbill Street featured a computer lab and several classrooms. Ground was broken on a new Luray-Page County Center in 2019, and Jenkins Hall was completed in 2021. The 13,000-square-foot facility features classrooms, science and health labs, a trades lab, a boardroom, and student commons areas.

== Accreditation ==
Laurel Ridge Community College is accredited by the Commission on Colleges of the Southern Association of Colleges and Schools to award associate degrees.
