= Mountain Gateway Community College =

Public college in Clifton Forge, Virginia, US

Coordinates: 37°48′42.2″N 79°51′6.6″W

- Former names: Clifton Forge–Covington Community College (1962–1967); Dabney S. Lancaster Community College (1967–2022)
- Type: Public community college
- Established: March 15, 1962
- Parent institution: Virginia Tech (1962–1967); Virginia Community College System (since 1967)
- Accreditation: SACS
- President: John J. Rainone
- Location: Clifton Forge, Virginia, U.S.
- Campus: 117 acres (0.47 km^{2}; 0.183 sq mi); Rural
- Other campus: Buena Vista, Virginia (Rockbridge Regional Center)
- Colors: Blue and orange
- Nickname: Roadrunners
- Sporting affiliations: NJCAA Division III – Carolinas Junior College Conference (Region 10)
- Website: www.mgcc.edu

Mountain Gateway Community College (MGCC, formerly Dabney S. Lancaster Community College) is a public community college in Clifton Forge, Virginia. It is part the Virginia Community College System.

== Academics ==
MGCC offers a wide variety of credit programs, including those for transfer and selected occupational, technical and allied health fields.

Non-credit classes, summer camps for youth and special topics seminars are offered throughout the year. The division of Workforce Services and Community Education customizes education and training for the unique needs of current and prospective employers.

== Location ==
The main campus is located in Clifton Forge, Virginia. MGCC also operates the Rockbridge Regional Center on Vista Links Drive in Buena Vista.

== Renaming ==
In 2022, the college was renamed from Dabney S. Lancaster Community College to Mountain Gateway Community College after a review of names prompted by the Virginia State Board for Community Colleges. The review found that school namesake Dabney S. Lancaster supported segregation and had ties to a white supremacist group.
