= Mountain Empire Community College =

Coordinates: 36°51′18.2″N 82°45′30.1″W

Mountain Empire Community College is a public community college in unincorporated Wise County, Virginia, near Big Stone Gap. It is one of the 23 schools in the Virginia Community College System. The college serves residents of Dickenson, Lee, Scott, and Wise counties, as well as the City of Norton. The first classes were offered in the Fall of 1972. Dr. Kristen Westover became the college's seventh president in July 2017.
