= List of colleges and universities in North Carolina =

The following is a list of colleges and universities in the U.S. state of North Carolina.

== Four-year colleges and universities in North Carolina ==
Institution	Location	Control	Type (Note: School types are based on the Carnegie Classification of Institutions of Higher Education.)	Enrollment (fall 2024)	Founded
Appalachian State University	Boone	Public	Master's university	21,570	1899
Barber-Scotia College	Concord	Private (Presbyterian HBCU)	Baccalaureate college (unaccredited)	(Note: Reported 117 students enrolled in 2025–26.)	1867
Barton College	Wilson	Private (Disciples of Christ)	Baccalaureate college	1,235	1902
Belmont Abbey College	Belmont	Private (Catholic)	Baccalaureate college	1,388	1876
Bennett College	Greensboro	Private (Methodist HBCU)	Baccalaureate college	180	1873
Brevard College	Brevard	Private	Baccalaureate college	875	1853
Cabarrus College of Health Sciences	Concord	Private	Special-focus institution	924	1942
Campbell University	Buies Creek	Private (Baptist)	Doctoral/professional university	4,963	1887
Carolina Christian College	Winston-Salem	Private (Churches of Christ)	Special-focus institution	71	1945
Carolina College of Biblical Studies	Fayetteville	Private (nondenominational)	Special-focus institution	212	1973
Carolina University	Winston-Salem	Private (nondenominational)	Master's university	880	1945
Carolinas College of Health Sciences	Charlotte	Public	Special-focus institution	632	1990
Catawba College	Salisbury	Private (United Church of Christ)	Baccalaureate college	1,376	1851
Charlotte Christian College and Theological Seminary	Charlotte	Private (nondenominational)	Special-focus institution	58	1996
Chowan University	Murfreesboro	Private (Baptist)	Baccalaureate college	675	1848
Davidson College	Davidson	Private (Presbyterian)	Baccalaureate college	1,869	1837
Duke University	Durham	Private (Methodist)	Research university	17,499	1838
East Carolina University	Greenville	Public	Research university	26,940	1907
Elizabeth City State University	Elizabeth City	Public (HBCU)	Baccalaureate college	2,258	1891
Elon University	Elon	Private (nonsectarian)	Doctoral/professional university	7,239	1889
Fayetteville State University	Fayetteville	Public (HBCU)	Master's university	7,107	1867
Gardner-Webb University	Boiling Springs	Private (nondenominational)	Doctoral/professional university	3,104	1905
Greensboro College	Greensboro	Private (Methodist)	Master's university	967	1838
Guilford College	Greensboro	Private (Quakers)	Baccalaureate college	1,180	1837
Heritage Bible College	Dunn	Private (Pentecostal)	Faith-related institution	26	1971
High Point University	High Point	Private (Methodist)	Baccalaureate college	6,331	1924
Hood Theological Seminary	Salisbury	Private (A.M.E. Zion)	Special-focus institution	115	1879
Johnson & Wales University - Charlotte	Charlotte	Private	Baccalaureate college	1,184	1914
Johnson C. Smith University	Charlotte	Private (Presbyterian HBCU)	Baccalaureate college	1,302	1867
Lees-McRae College	Banner Elk	Private (Presbyterian)	Baccalaureate college	910	1900
Lenoir–Rhyne University	Hickory	Private (Lutheran)	Master's university	2,256	1891
Livingstone College	Salisbury	Private (A.M.E. Zion HBCU)	Baccalaureate college	936	1879
Manna University	Fayetteville	Private (nondenominational)	Baccalaureate college	268	1978
Mars Hill University	Mars Hill	Private (nondenominational)	Baccalaureate college	1,110	1856
Meredith College	Raleigh	Private	Baccalaureate college	1,465	1891
Methodist University	Fayetteville	Private (Methodist)	Master's university	1,822	1956
Mid-Atlantic Christian University	Elizabeth City	Private (Christian Churches)	Baccalaureate college	140	1948
Montreat College	Montreat	Private (Presbyterian)	Baccalaureate college	962	1916
North Carolina A&T State University	Greensboro	Public (HBCU)	Research university	14,311	1891
North Carolina Central University	Durham	Public (HBCU)	Master's university	8,579	1909
North Carolina State University	Raleigh	Public	Research university	38,464	1887
North Carolina Wesleyan University	Rocky Mount	Private (Methodist)	Baccalaureate college	1,419	1956
Pfeiffer University	Misenheimer	Private (Methodist)	Master's university	889	1885
Queens University of Charlotte	Charlotte	Private (Presbyterian)	Master's university	1,599	1857
Saint Augustine's University	Raleigh	Private (Episcopal HBCU)	Baccalaureate college (unaccredited)	(Note: 175 students enrolled as of fall 2024. No students as of 2026, following bankruptcy and accreditation loss.)	1867
Salem College	Winston-Salem	Private (Moravian)	Baccalaureate college	549	1772
Shaw University	Raleigh	Private (Baptist HBCU)	Baccalaureate college	964	1865
Shepherds Theological Seminary	Cary	Private (nondenominational)	Faith-related institution	201	2003
Southeastern Baptist Theological Seminary and Judson College	Wake Forest	Private (Baptist)	Faith-related institution	3,220	1950
Southeastern Free Will Baptist College	Wendell	Private (Free Will Baptist)	Faith-related institution	64	1983
University of Mount Olive	Mount Olive	Private (Free Will Baptist)	Master's university	2,109	1951
University of North Carolina at Asheville	Asheville	Public	Baccalaureate college	3,056	1927
University of North Carolina at Chapel Hill (flagship university)	Chapel Hill	Public	Research university	32,438	1789
University of North Carolina at Charlotte	Charlotte	Public	Research university	31,091	1946
University of North Carolina at Greensboro	Greensboro	Public	Research university	18,012	1891
University of North Carolina at Pembroke	Pembroke	Public	Master's university	7,674	1887
University of North Carolina at Wilmington	Wilmington	Public	Research university	18,848	1947
University of North Carolina School of the Arts	Winston-Salem	Public	Special-focus Institution	1,111	1963
Wake Forest University	Winston-Salem	Private	Research university	9,322	1834
Warren Wilson College	Swannanoa	Private	Baccalaureate college	791	1894
Western Carolina University	Cullowhee	Public	Doctoral/professional university	11,686	1889
William Peace University	Raleigh	Private	Baccalaureate college	722	1857
Wingate University	Wingate	Private (Baptist)	Doctoral/professional university	3,458	1896
Winston-Salem State University	Winston-Salem	Public (HBCU)	Doctoral/professional university	4,782	1892

== Two-year institutions ==
=== North Carolina Community College System ===
- Alamance Community College
- Asheville–Buncombe Technical Community College
- Beaufort County Community College
- Bladen Community College
- Blue Ridge Community College
- Brunswick Community College
- Caldwell Community College & Technical Institute
- Cape Fear Community College
- Carteret Community College
- Catawba Valley Community College
- Central Carolina Community College
- Central Piedmont Community College
- Cleveland Community College
- Coastal Carolina Community College
- College of the Albemarle
- Craven Community College
- Davidson-Davie Community College
- Durham Technical Community College
- Edgecombe Community College
- Fayetteville Technical Community College
- Forsyth Technical Community College
- Gaston College
- Guilford Technical Community College
- Halifax Community College
- Haywood Community College
- Isothermal Community College
- James Sprunt Community College
- Johnston Community College
- Lenoir Community College
- Martin Community College
- Mayland Community College
- McDowell Technical Community College
- Mitchell Community College
- Montgomery Community College
- Nash Community College
- Pamlico Community College
- Piedmont Community College
- Pitt Community College
- Randolph Community College
- Richmond Community College
- Roanoke–Chowan Community College
- Robeson Community College
- Rockingham Community College
- Rowan–Cabarrus Community College
- Sandhills Community College
- Sampson Community College
- South Piedmont Community College
- Southeastern Community College
- Southwestern Community College
- Stanly Community College
- Surry Community College
- Tri-County Community College
- Vance–Granville Community College
- Wake Technical Community College
- Wayne Community College
- Western Piedmont Community College
- Wilkes Community College
- Wilson Community College

=== Private two-year institutions ===
- Louisburg College

== Defunct institutions ==
School	Location(s)	Control	Type	Founded	Defunct
Bailey Law School	Buncombe County	Private	Law school (Note: Carnegie classifications only listed for institutions in existence from 1973 onwards.)	1859	1877
Black Mountain College	Black Mountain	Private	Art college	1933	1957
Southwood College	Salemburg	Private	Associate's college	1965	1973
King's College	Charlotte	Private (for profit)	Associate's college	1901	2018
John Wesley University	High Point	Private (not for profit)	Faith-related institution	1903	2018
The Art Institute of Charlotte	Charlotte	Private (for profit)	Baccalaureate / associate's college	1973	2018
St. Andrews University	Laurinburg	Private (not for profit)	Baccalaureate college	1958	2025

== See also ==
- Education in North Carolina
- Higher education in the United States
- List of American institutions of higher education
- List of college athletic programs in North Carolina
- List of colleges and universities
- List of colleges and universities by country
- List of community colleges
- List of recognized higher education accreditation organizations
