= Eastern North Carolina =

Geographic region of the U.S. state of North Carolina

Coordinates: 35.4°N 77.5°W

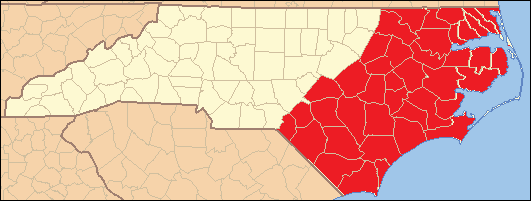
The counties most commonly associated with Eastern North Carolina. Many definitions will vary.

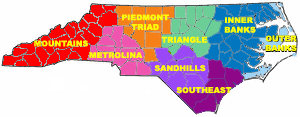
Regions of North Carolina

Eastern North Carolina (sometimes abbreviated as ENC) is the region encompassing the eastern tier of North Carolina, United States. It is known geographically as the state's Coastal Plain region. Primary subregions of Eastern North Carolina include the Sandhills, the Lower Cape Fear (Wilmington Area), the Crystal Coast, the Inner Banks and the Outer Banks. It is composed of the 41 most eastern counties in the state. Cities include Fayetteville, Greenville, Jacksonville, Wilmington, Rocky Mount and North Carolina's first capital New Bern.

In 1993, the State Legislature established seven regional economic development organizations and three of these serve eastern North Carolina - Northeast North Carolina Commission (covering 16 counties), North Carolina East Alliance (representing 13 counties surrounding North Carolina's Global TransPark), and North Carolina's Southeast Commission (assisting 11 counties).

New transitions are being made in the geography of the economic sectors. Economic Development Commissions are transforming, such as North Carolina's Eastern Region Commission's transition into North Carolina East Alliance. Different EDC's have different ways to increase prosperity in the area. NCEA's first focus is to improve the talent pipeline to create a more comprehensive local workforce. Shoop, the Commissioner for Washington's EDC stated "In a private setting, they would be able to access different funds for additional economic projects or initiatives in the county."

Located east of the Piedmont and west of the Atlantic Ocean, Eastern North Carolina contains very few major urban centers. Greenville is close to the region's geographic center. Fayetteville is the largest city in the region, followed by Wilmington and Greenville.

== Geography ==
Eastern North Carolina is roughly made up of the 41 easternmost counties in North Carolina. Generally, the region denotes all of the state's counties on and east of Interstate 95 (also known as East Coast USA Main Street, stretching from northern Maine to the southern tip of Florida). If defined by geological formations, eastern North Carolina comprises the 44 counties of the Inner and Outer Coastal Plains. In terms of economic similarities, the region includes 41 counties. The commonly accepted definition is all counties east of and crossed by Interstate 95, which is 41 counties. I-95 intersects with US64/264 at Wilson County and is in close proximity to I-40. This makes transportation throughout the region incredible along with easy access to the rest of the state and country. The region is further divisible into three geographic sections: the Southeast, Inner Banks and the Outer Banks.

== History ==
The coast of North Carolina were dominated by Native Americans, primarily the Tuscarora people residing near present-day Snow Hill. Eastern North Carolina is also home to the first attempted English settlement in the New World on Roanoke Island.

During the colonial era of American History, the East was the dominant region of North Carolina in both government and commerce. Towns of early significance included Bath, Beaufort, Elizabeth City, Edenton, Kinston, New Bern, Tarboro, and Wilmington. North Carolina's early economy was built upon cash crops, fisheries and turpentine industries. Early East Carolinians lived on settlements at the mouths of the various rivers. Settlers to the regions were of English, Scottish, Swiss and German descent. Eastern North Carolina was a haven for pirating and home to the infamous pirate Blackbeard. The city of New Bern was founded in 1710 by settlers from the Palatinate region of Germany, and later became the colonial capital. Around the end of the eighteenth century, however, such dominance shifted to the Piedmont center of the state.

The growth in population of the western and piedmont regions of North Carolina after the American Revolution led to revisions of the Constitution of North Carolina in 1835. These amendments included electing the governor by popular vote.

== Education ==
=== Four-year institutions ===
The region is dotted with universities. There are five public universities and seven private institutions in the region. The largest is East Carolina University, a Doctoral University with Higher Research Activity on the Carnegie scale. The four other public universities are Elizabeth City State University, Fayetteville State University, University of North Carolina at Pembroke, and University of North Carolina at Wilmington. The seven private institutions are: Barton College, Campbell University, Chowan University, Methodist University, University of Mount Olive, North Carolina Wesleyan College, and Mid-Atlantic Christian University.

=== Community colleges ===
The area is also served by 23 community colleges. The two-year institutes are: Beaufort County Community College, Bladen Community College, Brunswick Community College, Cape Fear Community College, Carteret Community College, College of the Albemarle, Coastal Carolina Community College, Craven Community College, Edgecombe Community College, Fayetteville Technical Community College, James Sprunt Community College, Johnston Community College, Lenoir Community College, Roanoke-Chowan Community College, Martin Community College, Nash Community College, Pamlico Community College, Pitt Community College, Sampson Community College, Sandhills Community College, Southeastern Community College, Wayne Community College, and Wilson Community College.

Many community colleges hold programs to create a more able workforce in Eastern North Carolina. The different economic clusters, including but not limited to advanced manufacturing (aerospace, automotive and industrial machinery), life sciences (Biopharma and medical device research, development and manufacturing), value-added agriculture (food processing, forest products, etc.) and marine products (boat building) have prompted Community Colleges to offer associate degrees in related fields (e.g. Airframe/power plant maintenance, composite technology, engineering technology, biotechnology and pharmaceutical manufacturing technology, machining and welding).

== Transportation ==
Eastern North Carolina is served by two main interstate highways and a number of U.S. routes.

=== Road Transportation ===
- Interstate 95 is the rough western edge of Eastern North Carolina passing through Rocky Mount, Wilson, Fayetteville and Lumberton.
- Interstate 40 serves the southeastern portion of the state, from Wayne County (near Mount Olive) to Wilmington in New Hanover County.
- I-795 is the main highway between Wilson and Goldsboro.
- U.S. 13 enters North Carolina close to the community of Drum Hill. It proceeds through Greenville and terminates into I-95 in Fayetteville.
- U.S. 17 enters North Carolina from Virginia beside the Dismal Swamp State Park. It continues through Washington, New Bern, and Wilmington and exits the state near Calabash onwards to South Carolina.
- U.S. 64 enters Rocky Mount from Raleigh. It continues to the eastern terminus in Nags Head.
- U.S. 70 enters the region at Selma. It continues through Goldsboro, Kinston, New Bern and Morehead City (deepwater port) on its way to the eastern terminus at the village of Atlantic. Just before reaching Atlantic, the highway connects with NC 12 that leads to the Cedar Island/Ocracoke Ferry that connects to the Outer Banks.
- U.S. 74 begins in Wrightsville Beach. The route stays close to the South Carolina line and exits the region near Lumberton.
- U.S. 76 runs concurrent with U.S. 74 from Wrightsville Beach to Chadbourn. It exits the state near Fair Buff into South Carolina.
- U.S. 117 is an offshoot of U.S. 17, beginning at I-95 in Wilson and terminating at the Port of Wilmington.
- The eastern terminus of U.S. 158 is in Nags Head. It continues through Elizabeth City, then it exits the area, crossing I-95 close to Roanoke Rapids.
- Jacksonville is the southern terminus of U.S. 258. It continues north through Kinston and Tarboro, exiting the state near Mill Neck.
- The eastern terminus of U.S. 264 is at U.S. 64 at Manns Harbor. It continues south to Swan Quarter, even though it doesn't go through the town. It then goes west through Washington and bypasses Greenville. It leaves Eastern North Carolina at I-95 in Wilson.
- US 301 closely parallels I-95 throughout North Carolina. It enters the state from South Carolina, crossing over I-95 near Rowland. It leaves the state near Pleasant Hill on its way to Virginia.
- US 401 serves Harnett, Cumberland, Hoke, and Scotland counties.
- US 421 enters the region in Harnett County and terminates at Carolina Beach.
- US 701's northern terminus is in Four Oaks. It continues south through Newton Grove and Clinton and exits the state near Tabor City.

Over 60 motor freight carriers provide service to all parts of the nation.

FedEx, UPS, DHL and Emery have offices in all major communities.

The transportation within the region allows for easy access to anywhere in the continental United States of America. I-40 and I-95 are capable of this with close proximity to I-85 as well. Manufacturers can move their goods efficiently and families can travel with ease.

Much of the region's main highways have been designated as the Historic Albemarle Tour, which connects many historic sites in Eastern North Carolina.

=== Rail Transportation ===
CSX, Norfolk Southern Railway, and the North Carolina Railroad Company serve the industries within the region. The National Railroad Passenger Corporation, Amtrak, is a train service for passengers. Amtrak passenger stations are located in Rocky Mount, Wilson, Selma, Fayetteville and throughout North Carolina and the Eastern region.

=== Air Transportation ===
Wilmington International Airport is in Eastern North Carolina along with RDU within a short driving distance. Raleigh-Durham International can be reached via I-40 (with I-440 or I-540 being additional options). There are several ways to access Wilmington International easily when in the region, using I-40 or US-17.

There are also sixteen regional airports that serve general aviation in the Eastern region of North Carolina: Greenville, Jacksonville and New Bern provide commuter service to Charlotte, Atlanta, Cincinnati and Philadelphia.

== Global Transpark ==
The North Carolina Global TransPark (GTP) is a 2,500 acre, multi-modal industrial park.

== Ports ==
There are deep-water bulk, break-bulk cargo and container facilities in ENC at Morehead City, NC and Wilmington, NC. A third comprehensive deep-water (Panamx-ready) port exists just north of the state line in Norfolk/Portsmouth, VA. All three ports also have RoRo (roll-on, roll-off) facilities to handle autos and military equipment.

== Government ==
The local government of Eastern North Carolina is served by seven of the 16 North Carolina Councils of Government. They include the Upper Coastal Plain Council of Governments, Mid-Carolina Council of Governments, Lumber River Council of Governments, Cape Fear Council of Governments, Eastern Carolina Council of Governments, Mid-East Commission, and the Albemarle Commission.

== Socio-economic ==
Eastern North Carolina is by and large an impoverished area. Nearly 21 percent of people live in poverty in this region. Outsourcing of textile manufacturing jobs along with other manufacturing jobs has caused unemployment in the area to increase particularly in the northeastern area of the state. Many areas of Eastern North Carolina are experiencing little economic growth; however, areas such as Greenville and Winterville (Pitt County) are growing rapidly due to the location of East Carolina University and its associated medical facilities. Fleet Readiness Center East on board Marine Corps Air Station Cherry Point is the largest industrial employer east of Interstate 95, with an annual payroll of $277 million.

== Topography ==
Eastern North Carolina is located in the Atlantic Coastal Plain region on the East Coast of the United States, and has relatively flat land that is primarily used for farming. The Outer Banks and Inner Banks are comparable to the Tidewater region of Virginia in terms of topography.

== Area ==
Eastern North Carolina generally consists of 41 counties, which when combined form a total regional area of roughly 9,700 square miles (25000 square km). The counties commonly included in the region are as follows:

1. Bertie County
2. Beaufort County
3. Bladen County
4. Brunswick County
5. Camden County
6. Carteret County
7. Chowan County
8. Columbus County
9. Craven County
10. Cumberland County
11. Currituck County
12. Dare County
13. Duplin County
14. Edgecombe County
15. Gates County
16. Greene County
17. Halifax County
18. Harnett County
19. Hertford County
20. Hoke County
21. Hyde County
22. Johnston County
23. Jones County
24. Lenoir County
25. Martin County
26. Nash County
27. New Hanover County
28. Northampton County
29. Onslow County
30. Pamlico County
31. Pasquotank County
32. Pender County
33. Perquimans County
34. Pitt County
35. Robeson County
36. Sampson County
37. Scotland County
38. Tyrrell County
39. Washington County
40. Wayne County
41. Wilson County

=== Cities and towns ===
Eastern North Carolina communities in the region include:

==== Over 50,000 in population ====
- Fayetteville
- Greenville
- Jacksonville
- Rocky Mount
- Wilmington

==== Fewer than 50,000 population ====
- Ahoskie
- Alliance
- Angier
- Arapahoe
- Atkinson
- Atlantic Beach
- Aulander
- Aurora
- Autryville
- Ayden
- Bald Head Island
- Bath
- Bayboro
- Bear Grass
- Beaufort
- Belhaven
- Belville
- Bethel
- Beulaville
- Black Creek
- Bladenboro
- Bogue
- Boiling Spring Lakes
- Bolivia
- Bridgeton
- Burgaw
- Calabash
- Cape Carteret
- Carolina Beach
- Carolina Shores
- Caswell Beach
- Chadbourn
- Chocowinity
- Columbia
- Edenton
- Elizabeth City
- Elizabethtown
- Elm City
- Emerald Isle
- Faison
- Falkland
- Farmville
- Fremont
- Garland
- Gatesville
- Goldsboro
- Grifton
- Grimesland
- Kinston
- Laurinburg
- Lewiston
- Lumberton
- Morehead City
- New Bern
- Newport
- Pantego
- Roanoke Rapids
- Snow Hill
- Sneads Ferry
- Tarboro
- Washington
- Williamston
- Wilson
