= Inner Banks =

Region of eastern North Carolina, USA

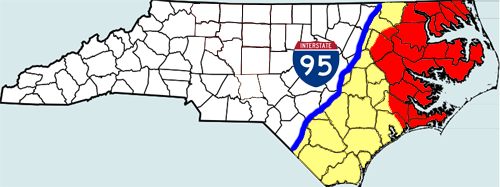
Counties shaded red are most commonly associated with the term Inner Banks. Counties shaded yellow are occasionally included in Inner Banks definitions.

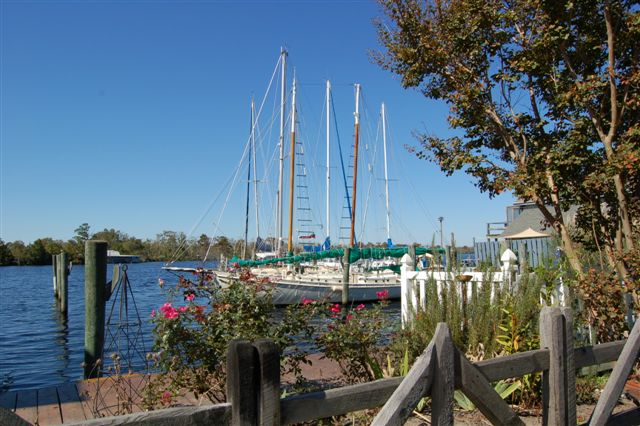
Columbia, North Carolina

The Inner Banks are the inland coastal region of eastern North Carolina. Without historical precedent, the term "Inner Banks" is an early 21st-century construct that is part of an attempt to rebrand the mostly agrarian Coastal Plains east of I-95 as a more attractive region for visitors and retirees.

== Context and history ==
Map of the Middle Atlantic coastal forests.

The current Inner Banks region was historically grouped with the Sandhills as the Carolinas and Georgia's Piney Woods. Around the time of the Civil War, people from the area were known as "Goobers". The regional name and demonym fell from use over time as the area was deforested.

The present term suggests relation to the historical area known as the Outer Banks, a string of barrier islands off the coast of North Carolina that have long been a popular tourist attraction. The demand for waterfront property in eastern North Carolina as a site for second homes for the relatively wealthy has resulted in a tremendous disparity of prices in such locales. Frequently otherwise equivalent lots on opposite sides of a road will have broadly divergent tax and appraisal values. For example, on Rock Creek Road in Jones County, riverfront lots on the Trent River had a tax value of $201,286 per acre; lots immediately across the road had a tax value of $33,634 per acre, according to the Jones County GIS maps.

The developers and tourism promoters have broadly defined the Inner Banks as an area on the East Coast of North Carolina that is 22,227 square miles (57,568 km^{2}). The so-called Inner Banks comprises over 3,000 miles of inland coastline and is home to over 2.5 million residents. Marketing people include the Crystal Coast and Albemarle regions of the state in the Inner Banks. Having a moderate climate, the area is becoming a popular destination for retirees and small business entrepreneurs. "Inner Banks" is sometimes abbreviated with the acronym IBX, another attempt at trendiness.

The general definition states that the Inner Banks is a region between Interstate 95 to the west, the Outer Banks to the east, and extend from the Virginia border to the South Carolina border. Consisting of 41 counties, the region is three times the size of the state of New Jersey. Many areas farther from the sounds and tidal rivers have not embraced the Inner Banks brand and are seldom included in the definition. Traditionally dependent on agriculture and the textile industry, eastern North Carolina has worked to redefine the region's strengths to transition into the new global economy.

Six small towns in the Inner Banks have joined in what they call the Creative Communities Initiative. They are working to foster an environment attractive to knowledge workers, artists, and other people working in the creative economy. These six towns are: Ayden, Edenton, Hertford, Murfreesboro, Plymouth, and Tarboro.

== Albemarle Region ==
Northeastern North Carolina (or the Albemarle Region) consists of 14 counties in northeast North Carolina that surround Albemarle Sound and its tributaries, such as the Chowan and the Roanoke rivers. It has numerous attractions in terms of its undeveloped beaches, rivers, and small towns. Historic sites within the Albemarle Region are identified along the Historic Albemarle Tour.

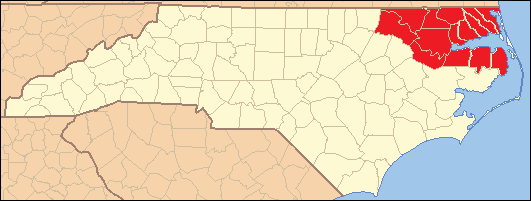
The counties most commonly associated with northeastern North Carolina. Many definitions will vary.

=== History ===
This waterway-rich region was inhabited for thousands of years by various cultures of indigenous peoples. By the historic period of European contact, the coastal area was occupied primarily by Algonquian-speaking tribes. The other two major language families of historic tribes in the state were Siouan languages and Iroquoian languages.

After European contact, the area which is now northeastern North Carolina and southeastern Virginia was one of the first in North America to be settled by English and related northern Europeans. Virginia Dare was born on nearby Roanoke Island in 1587, in what is today part of North Carolina. She is recorded as the first English child born in North America. The Roanoke colony did not survive.

From the 17th century through the antebellum era, the cash crops were tobacco and cotton, both of which were labor-intensive in cultivation and processing. Major planters imported thousands of enslaved Africans for their work force through 1808, when the Atlantic trade was prohibited by Congress. They and their descendants were integral to the survival and success of the North Carolina colony and later state. Tobacco was especially labor-intensive and exhausted the soil. Some of the first tobacco planters shifted to mixed farming by the end of the 18th century to restore their soils.

Most of the region was relatively prosperous for white planters until the American Civil War. The productive farmland and shipping industries became a frequent target for Union invasions. Several towns in the region were burned to the ground by Union troops during this time, including Plymouth and Winton. Confederate forces at Plymouth made the first use of an ironclad warship, the CSS Albemarle.

After the war, the region was slow to change its economy. The area continued to rely on agriculture for its main economic base, which suffered a decline through the end of the 19th century.

== Central Coast ==
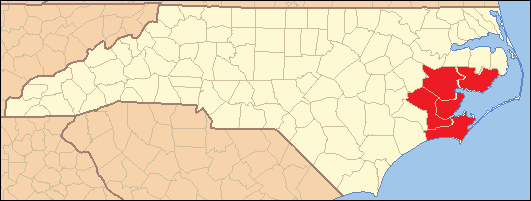
The counties most commonly associated with the Pamlico Region of North Carolina. Many definitions will vary.

The Central Coast or Pamlico Region consists of 5 counties in eastern North Carolina that border the Pamlico Sound and its tributaries, such as the Neuse and the Pungo rivers. This region also includes the southern portion of the Outer Banks and most of the Crystal Coast in Carteret County.

== Cape Fear Region ==
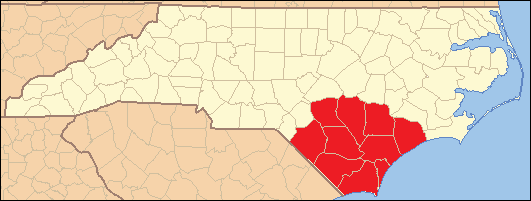
The counties most commonly associated with southeastern North Carolina. Many definitions will vary.

Southeastern North Carolina (or the Cape Fear Region) consists of 10 counties in southeast North Carolina that border the Cape Fear River and its tributaries, such as the Black and South rivers. The region primarily consists of rural farmland and coastal communities.

== Area ==
=== Counties ===
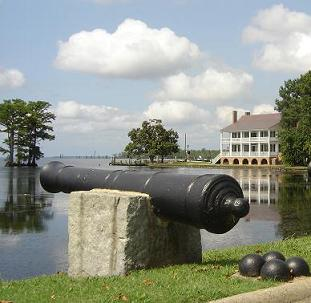
Edenton, North Carolina

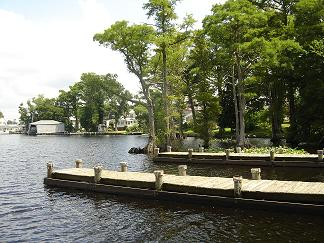
Hertford, North Carolina

The following is a list of counties usually considered a part of the Inner Banks (listed alphabetically):

Generally:

- Beaufort County
- Bertie County
- Camden County
- Carteret County
- Chowan County
- Craven County
- mainland Currituck County
- mainland Dare County
- eastern Edgecombe County
- Gates County
- eastern Halifax County
- Hertford County
- mainland Hyde County
- eastern Jones County
- Martin County
- Northampton County
- eastern Onslow County
- Pamlico County
- Pasquotank County
- Perquimans County
- Pitt County
- Tyrrell County
- Washington County
- Wayne County

Occasionally:

- Bladen County
- Columbus County
- southeastern Cumberland County
- Duplin County
- Greene County
- Lenoir County
- eastern Robeson County
- southern Sampson County
- Wilson County

=== Cities and towns ===
The following is a list of some of the towns and communities in the Inner Banks (listed alphabetically):

- Ahoskie
- Ayden
- Arapahoe
- Aurora
- Bath
- Bayboro
- Beaufort
- Belhaven
- Bethel
- Camden
- Chocowinity
- Columbia
- Corapeake
- Creswell
- Currituck
- Edenton
- Elizabeth City
- Eure
- Eureka
- Farmville
- Fremont
- Gates
- Gatesville
- Greenville
- Goldsboro
- Grifton
- Hampstead
- Harkers Island
- Havelock
- Hertford
- Hobbsville
- Jacksonville
- Knotts Island
- Morehead City
- Moyock
- Murfreesboro
- New Bern
- Newport
- Oak City
- Oriental
- Pantego
- Plymouth
- Robersonville
- Roducco
- Roper
- Stantonsburg
- Sunbury
- Swan Quarter
- Swansboro
- Tarboro
- Trenton
- Vanceboro
- Washington
- Williamston
- Windsor
- Winfall
- Winterville
- Winton

== Parks ==
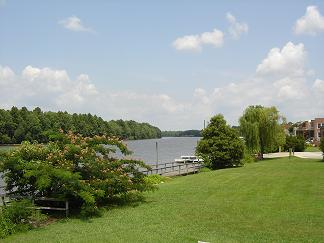
View of Roanoke River National Wildlife Refuge from Plymouth, North Carolina.

- Dismal Swamp State Park
- Goose Creek State Park
- Merchants Millpond State Park
- Pettigrew State Park

== Wildlife refuges ==
- Alligator River National Wildlife Refuge
- Cedar Island National Wildlife Refuge
- Great Dismal Swamp National Wildlife Refuge
- Mattamuskeet National Wildlife Refuge
- Pocosin Lakes National Wildlife Refuge
- Roanoke River National Wildlife Refuge
- Swanquarter National Wildlife Refuge

== Colleges and universities ==
- Chowan University
- East Carolina University
- Elizabeth City State University
- Mid-Atlantic Christian University
- Beaufort County Community College
- Carteret Community College
- Coastal Carolina Community College
- College of the Albemarle
- Craven Community College
- Edgecombe Community College
- Halifax Community College
- Martin Community College
- Pamlico Community College
- Pitt Community College
- Roanoke-Chowan Community College

== See also ==
- Atlantic Coastal Plain
- Crystal Coast
- Down East
- Intracoastal Waterway
- Outer Banks
- Southeastern North Carolina
- Tidewater region
