= List of college athletic programs in North Carolina =

This is a list of college athletic programs in the U.S. state of North Carolina.

== NCAA ==
=== Division I ===
Full NCAA Division I member colleges in North Carolina.
- FBS Football, - FCS Football, - Non-football

Team	School	City	Conference	Sport sponsorship						
Team	School	City	Conference	Football	Basketball		Baseball	Softball	Soccer	
Team	School	City	Conference	Football	M	W	Baseball	Softball	M	W
Appalachian State Mountaineers	Appalachian State University	Boone	Sun Belt	FBS	Yes	Yes	Yes	Yes	No	Yes
Campbell Fighting Camels	Campbell University	Buies Creek	CAA	FCS (Note: Campbell, Elon, and North Carolina A&T's football teams all compete in CAA Football, the technically separate football league operated by the all-sports CAA.)	Yes	Yes	Yes	Yes	Yes	Yes
Charlotte 49ers	University of North Carolina at Charlotte	Charlotte	AAC	FBS	Yes	Yes	Yes	Yes	Yes	Yes
Davidson Wildcats	Davidson College	Davidson	Atlantic 10	FCS (Note: Davidson's football team competes in the Pioneer Football League.)	Yes	Yes	Yes	No	Yes	Yes
Duke Blue Devils	Duke University	Durham	ACC	FBS	Yes	Yes	Yes	Yes	Yes	Yes
East Carolina Pirates	East Carolina University	Greenville	AAC	FBS	Yes	Yes	Yes	Yes	No	Yes
Elon Phoenix	Elon University	Elon	CAA	FCS	Yes	Yes	Yes	Yes	Yes	Yes
Gardner-Webb Runnin' Bulldogs	Gardner-Webb University	Boiling Springs	Big South	FCS (Note: Gardner-Webb’s football team competes in the Ohio Valley Conference.)	Yes	Yes	Yes	Yes	Yes	Yes
High Point Panthers	High Point University	High Point	Big South	No	Yes	Yes	Yes	No	Yes	Yes
NC State Wolfpack	North Carolina State University	Raleigh	ACC	FBS	Yes	Yes	Yes	Yes	Yes	Yes
North Carolina Tar Heels	University of North Carolina at Chapel Hill	Chapel Hill	ACC	FBS	Yes	Yes	Yes	Yes	Yes	Yes
North Carolina A&T Aggies	North Carolina Agricultural and Technical State University	Greensboro	CAA	FCS	Yes	Yes	Yes	Yes	No	No
North Carolina Central Eagles	North Carolina Central University	Durham	MEAC	FCS	Yes	Yes	No	Yes	No	No
Queens Royals	Queens University of Charlotte	Charlotte	ASUN	No	Yes	Yes	Yes	Yes	Yes	Yes
UNC Asheville Bulldogs	University of North Carolina at Asheville	Asheville	Big South	No	Yes	Yes	Yes	No	Yes	Yes
UNC Greensboro Spartans	University of North Carolina at Greensboro	Greensboro	Southern	No	Yes	Yes	Yes	Yes	Yes	Yes
UNC Wilmington Seahawks	University of North Carolina at Wilmington	Wilmington	CAA	No	Yes	Yes	Yes	Yes	Yes	Yes
Wake Forest Demon Deacons	Wake Forest University	Winston-Salem	ACC	FBS	Yes	Yes	Yes	No	Yes	Yes
Western Carolina Catamounts	Western Carolina University	Cullowhee	Southern	FCS	Yes	Yes	Yes	Yes	No	Yes

=== Division II ===
Full NCAA Division II member colleges in North Carolina.
- Football, - Non-football

Team	School	City	Conference	Sport sponsorship						
Team	School	City	Conference	Football	Basketball		Baseball	Softball	Soccer	
Team	School	City	Conference	Football	M	W	Baseball	Softball	M	W
Barton Bulldogs	Barton College	Wilson	Carolinas	Yes	Yes	Yes	Yes	Yes	Yes	Yes
Belmont Abbey Crusaders	Belmont Abbey College	Belmont	Carolinas	No	Yes	Yes	Yes	Yes	Yes	Yes
Catawba Indians	Catawba College	Salisbury	South Atlantic	Yes	Yes	Yes	Yes	Yes	Yes	Yes
Chowan Hawks	Chowan University	Murfreesboro	Carolinas	Yes	Yes	Yes	Yes	Yes	Yes	Yes
Elizabeth City State Vikings	Elizabeth City State University	Elizabeth City	CIAA	Yes	Yes	Yes	No	Yes	No	No
Fayetteville State Broncos	Fayetteville State University	Fayetteville	CIAA	Yes	Yes	Yes	No	Yes	No	No
Johnson C. Smith Golden Bulls	Johnson C. Smith University	Charlotte	CIAA	Yes	Yes	Yes	No	Yes	No	No
Lees-McRae Bobcats	Lees-McRae College	Banner Elk	Carolinas	No	Yes	Yes	No	Yes	Yes	Yes
Lenoir-Rhyne Bears	Lenoir-Rhyne University	Hickory	South Atlantic	Yes	Yes	Yes	Yes	Yes	Yes	Yes
Livingstone Blue Bears	Livingstone College	Salisbury	CIAA	Yes	Yes	Yes	No	Yes	No	No
Mars Hill Lions	Mars Hill University	Mars Hill	South Atlantic	Yes	Yes	Yes	Yes	Yes	Yes	Yes
Mount Olive Trojans	University of Mount Olive	Mount Olive	Carolinas	No	Yes	Yes	Yes	Yes	Yes	Yes
Shaw Bears	Shaw University	Raleigh	CIAA	Yes	Yes	Yes	No	Yes	Yes (Note: Shaw's soccer teams compete as independents.)	Yes
UNC Pembroke Braves	University of North Carolina at Pembroke	Pembroke	Carolinas	Yes	Yes	Yes	Yes	Yes	No	Yes
Wingate Bulldogs	Wingate University	Wingate	South Atlantic	Yes	Yes	Yes	Yes	Yes	Yes	Yes
Winston-Salem State Rams and Lady Rams	Winston-Salem State University	Winston-Salem	CIAA	Yes	Yes	Yes	No	Yes	No	No

=== Division III ===
Full NCAA Division III member colleges in North Carolina.
- Football, - Non-football

Team	School	City	Conference	Sport sponsorship						
Team	School	City	Conference	Football	Basketball		Baseball	Softball	Soccer	
Team	School	City	Conference	Football	M	W	Baseball	Softball	M	W
Brevard Tornados	Brevard College	Brevard	USA South	Yes	Yes	Yes	Yes	Yes	Yes	Yes
Greensboro Pride	Greensboro College	Greensboro	USA South	Yes	Yes	Yes	Yes	Yes	Yes	Yes
Guilford Quakers	Guilford College	Greensboro	Old Dominion	Yes	Yes	Yes	Yes	Yes	Yes	Yes
Johnson & Wales Wildcats	Johnson & Wales University (Note: As of the 2025-26 academic year, Johnson & Wales is in the first year of a three-year transition to Division III and will be an active member in 2028-29.)	Charlotte	C2C	No	Yes	Yes	Yes	Yes	Yes	Yes
Meredith Angels	Meredith College	Raleigh	USA South	No	No	Yes	No	Yes	No	Yes
Methodist Monarchs	Methodist University	Fayetteville	USA South	Yes	Yes	Yes	Yes	Yes	Yes	Yes
North Carolina Wesleyan Battling Bishops	North Carolina Wesleyan University	Rocky Mount	USA South	Yes	Yes	Yes	Yes	Yes	Yes	Yes
Pfeiffer Falcons	Pfeiffer University	Misenheimer	USA South	No	Yes	Yes	Yes	Yes	Yes	Yes
Salem Spirits	Salem College	Winston-Salem	USA South	No	No	Yes	No	Yes	No	Yes
Warren Wilson Owls	Warren Wilson College	Swannanoa	C2C	No	Yes	Yes	No	No	Yes	Yes
William Peace Pacers	William Peace University	Raleigh	USA South	No	Yes	Yes	Yes	Yes	Yes	Yes

== NAIA ==
Full NAIA member colleges in North Carolina.
- Football, - Non-football

Team	School	City	Conference	Sport sponsorship						
Team	School	City	Conference	Football	Basketball		Baseball	Softball	Soccer	
Team	School	City	Conference	Football	M	W	Baseball	Softball	M	W
Carolina Bruins	Carolina University	Winston-Salem	Continental	No	Yes	Yes	Yes	Yes	Yes	Yes
Montreat Cavaliers	Montreat College	Montreat	Appalachian	No	Yes	Yes	Yes	Yes	Yes	Yes

== USCAA ==
Team	School	City
MACU Mustangs	Mid-Atlantic Christian University	Elizabeth City
Shaw Bears	Shaw University	Raleigh

== NCCAA ==
Team	School	City	Division
Carolina Bruins	Carolina University	Winston-Salem	I

== NJCAA ==
Team	School	City	Conference
Albemarle Dolphins	College of The Albemarle	Elizabeth City	Carolinas JC
Brunswick Dolphins	Brunswick Community College	Bolivia	Carolinas JC
Caldwell Cobras	Caldwell Community College & Technical Institute	Hudson	Carolinas JC
Cape Fear Sea Devils	Cape Fear Community College	Wilmington	Carolinas JC
Catawba Valley Red Hawks	Catawba Valley Community College	Hickory	Carolinas JC
Central Carolina Cougars	Central Carolina Community College	Sanford	Carolinas JC
Davidson County Storm	Davidson County Community College	Thomasville	Carolinas JC
Guilford Tech Titans	Guilford Technical Community College	Jamestown	Carolinas JC
Johnston Jaguars	Johnston Community College	Smithfield	Carolinas JC
Lenoir Lancers	Lenoir Community College	Kinston	Carolinas JC
Louisburg Hurricanes	Louisburg College	Louisburg	Carolinas JC
Pitt Bulldogs	Pitt Community College	Greenville	Carolinas JC
Rockingham Eagles	Rockingham Community College	Wentworth	Carolinas JC
Sandhills Flyers	Sandhills Community College	Pinehurst	Carolinas JC
Southeastern Rams	Southeastern Community College	Whiteville	Carolinas JC
Surry Knights	Surry Community College	Dobson	Carolinas JC
Vance-Granville Vanguards	Vance-Granville Community College	Henderson	Carolinas JC
Wake Tech Eagles	Wake Technical Community College	Raleigh	Carolinas JC

== See also ==
- List of NCAA Division I institutions
- List of NCAA Division II institutions
- List of NCAA Division III institutions
- List of NAIA institutions
- List of USCAA institutions
- List of NCCAA institutions
- List of NJCAA Division I institutions
- List of NJCAA Division II institutions
- List of NJCAA Division III institutions
