= North Carolina Learning Object Repository =

NCLOR
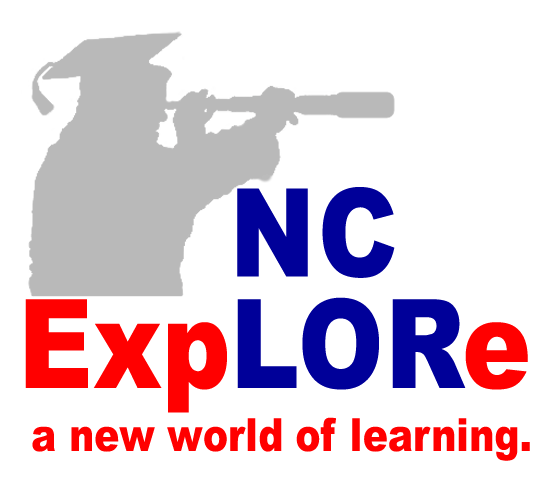
- Developer(s): Team NCLOR
- Stable release: 6.4 GA / June 27, 2015
- Written in: Equella
- Operating system: Cross-platform
- Type: Institutional repository
- License: Equella license based on FTE
- Website: https://opennccc.nccommunitycolleges.edu/

The North Carolina Learning Object Repository (NCLOR) is a service offered by the North Carolina Community College System (NCCCS), that provides a central location to manage, collect, contribute, and share digital learning resources for use in traditional or distance learning environments. The NCLOR is available to all K-20 teachers across the state and provide vendor and peer resources for users. NCLOR participants include the 58 colleges from the North Carolina Community College System (NCCCS), University of North Carolina (UNC) System, North Carolina Independent Colleges and Universities (36 private institutions), the North Carolina Department of Public Instruction (DPI), and North Carolina Virtual Public School (NCVPS).

== History ==
A centralized NCLOR was conceived in 2006 at the NCCCS to be a repository of digital learning content that will be accessed and utilized by all PreK-20 educational institutions in North Carolina, eliminating the duplicative costs of content development and allowing seamless integration with an LMS.

Representatives from all NC educational sectors (NCCCS, UNC, Independent Colleges & Universities) participated in creation and development of NCLOR from inception to production. It was conceptualized that the NCLOR would provide the following benefits:

- Centralize hosting to reduce costs of hardware and IT;
- Capability for instructors to share Learning Object (LO) items;
- Capability for newly developed LO items to be moderated, improved, deployed, and shared;
- Reduce duplication of effort and save development resources statewide;
- Integrate easily with a Learning Management System (LMS) for ease of course creation
- The ability to set permissions for client populations;
- Report and usage capabilities; and
- Conform to standards governing content, protocol, and federation.

The NCLOR began production in January 2008, fully integrated with course management and data systems, and fully operational for North Carolina faculty to create and use sharable content.

=== Technology ===
The NCLOR partners with the North Carolina Office of Information Technology Services (ITS), which provides application hosting and broadband connectivity. The underlying database technology by the Equella software allows easy searching, contribution, and classification by NCCCS staff or partner faculty. Safeguards are implemented to ensure that individual copyright and digital rights are not abused. Integration with an LMS such as Blackboard or Moodle allows ease of course creation.

== Community ==
Supporting the NCLOR effort is the Virtual Learning Community (VLC). The NCCCS awarded grants to fund three VLC Support Centers over three fiscal years through 2011. These grants were awarded to:

- Surry Community College (SCC) for Quality Assessment
- Fayetteville Technical Community College (FTCC) for the Technology Center
- Wake Technical Community College (WTCC) for the Professional Development Center

In addition, a Development Center at Fayetteville Technical Community College was created to develop courses in the following areas:

- 14 STEM courses
- 10 Continuing Education courses
- 5 Business courses
- 1 Humanities course
