= Scott Ralls =

American education leader

Dr. Scott Ralls
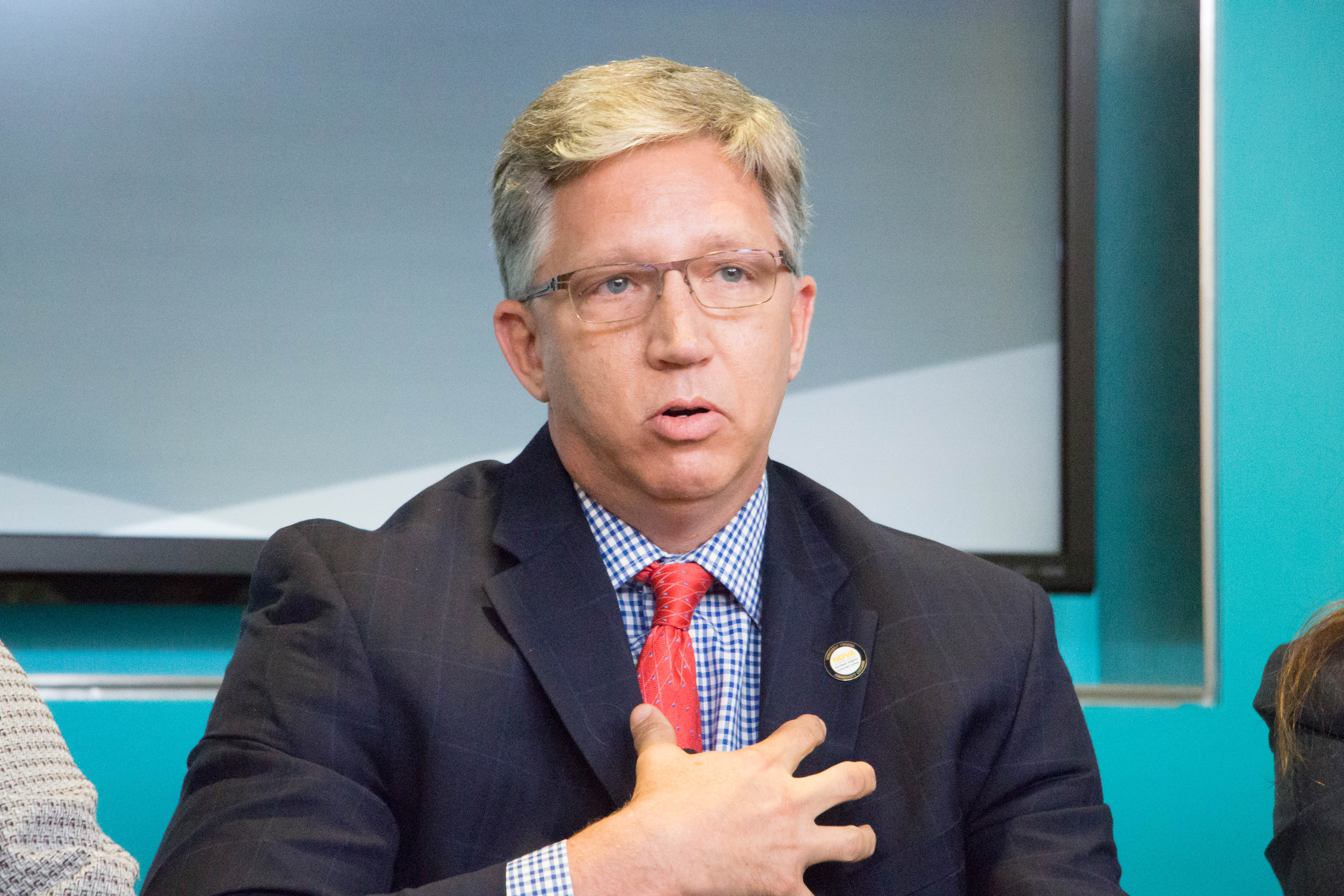
- Dr. Scott Ralls became the fourth president of Wake Technical Community College on April 11, 2019

President of the North Carolina Community College System
- Preceded by: Martin Lancaster
- Succeeded by: Jimmie Williamson

Dr. R. Scott Ralls is the fourth president of Wake Technical Community College. He was selected on December 6, 2007, as president of the North Carolina Community College System, serving from 2008 to 2015. In 2015, Dr. Ralls became president of Northern Virginia Community College.

Ralls was born in Charlotte, North Carolina, the son of a Methodist minister. He obtained a B.S. in Industrial Relations and Psychology from the University of North Carolina at Chapel Hill and a Ph.D. in Industrial and Organizational Psychology and a Master of Arts, Industrial /Organizational Psychology, both from the University of Maryland.

Ralls served as president of Craven Community College from 2002 through 2008. Prior to becoming the president of Craven Community College, he was the vice president for Economic and Workforce Development at the NC Community College System Office, director of Economic Development at the System Office, and a director at the North Carolina Department of Commerce.

| Preceded by Martin Lancaster | President, North Carolina Community College System; 2008-2015 | Succeeded by Jimmie Williamson; George Fouts, interim (2015-16) |
