= RCCC =

RCCC may refer to:

- Rowan–Cabarrus Community College, an American college in North Carolina
- Royal Caledonian Curling Club, a curling club in Scotland
- Red/Clear Sensors, a Color filter array
