= Tha Rapper Haiti =

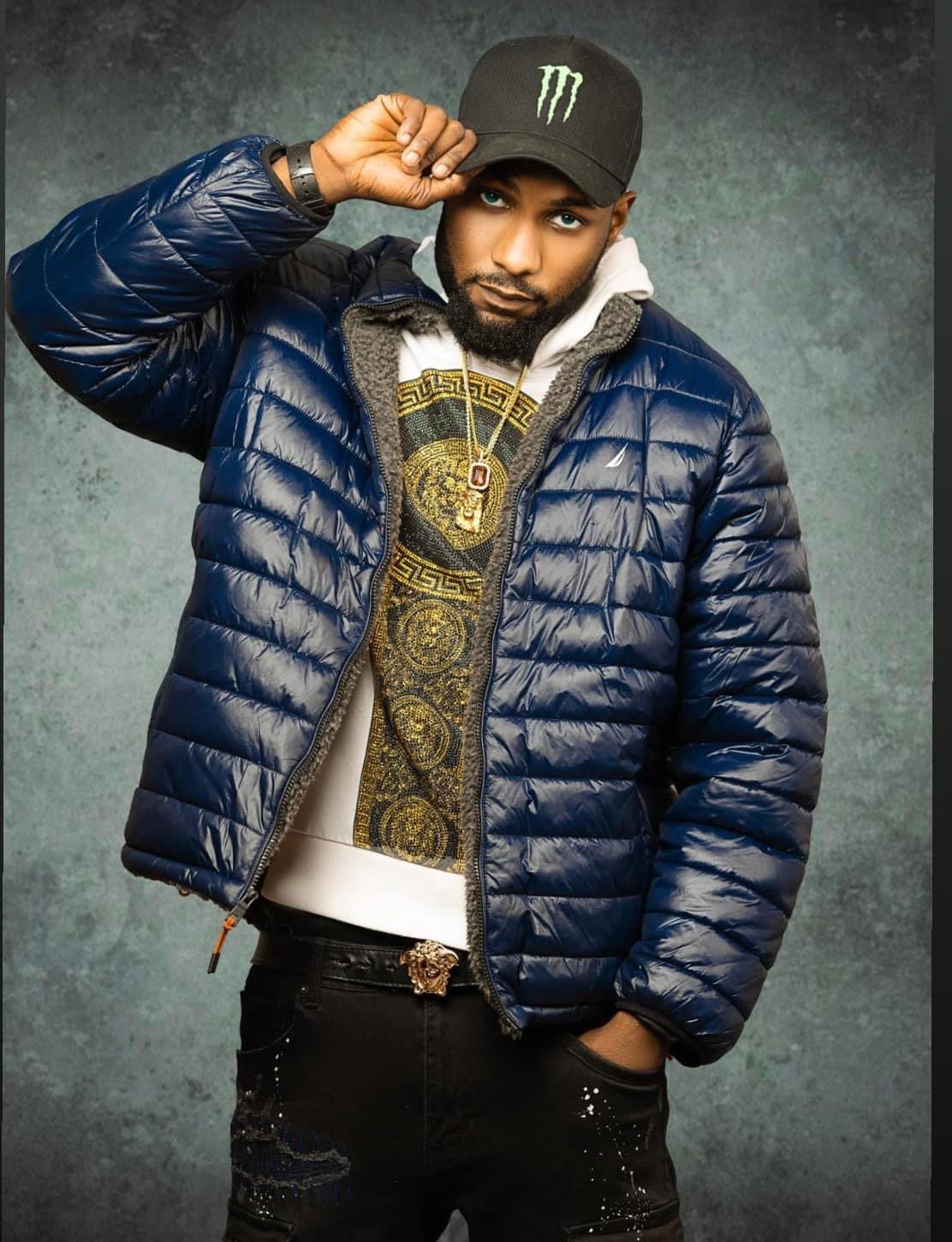
- Tha Rapper Haiti in 2022

Background information
- Also known as: Tha Rapper Haiti
- Born: James Prospere; November 5, 1996 (age 29); Port-au-Prince, Haiti
- Origin: Haiti / United States
- Genres: hip-hop, trap
- Occupations: Rapper, songwriter, and music producer
- Years active: 2014–present
- Website: tharapperhaiti.com/home
- Education: Wilson Community College
- Height: 5’11 (1.80m)

Signature
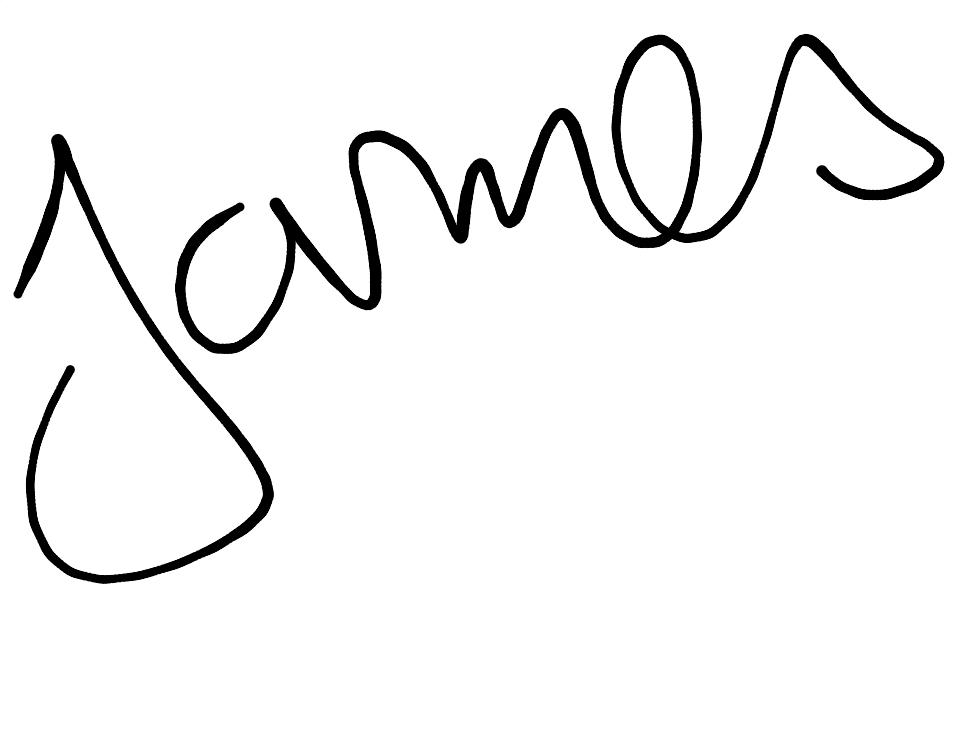

James Prospere (born November 05, 1996), known as Tha Rapper Haiti, is a Haitian-American rapper, songwriter, and music producer. His songs are often about themes of empowerment and social issues affecting Haiti.

== Biography ==
=== Early life and education ===
James Prospere, known professionally as Tha Rapper Haiti, was born on November 05, 1996, in Port-au-Prince, Haiti. Born into a family of musicians, Prospere developed his liking for music and started his music activities at an early age. He moved to the United States in 2013. He attended Wilson Community College, where he graduated as a computer scientist with a computing and systems analysis degree.

== Career ==
Tha Rapper Haiti started his music career between 2014 and 2015 when he released his debut mixtape, Pale vit Pale Cho. He became a music producer at the age of 18 and started working with other musicians in Haiti. He has written 15 songs and released several singles, including Vibe la, I Do What I Want, and the collaborative track Twerk featuring DNS Soldier.

His songs often reflect tackling social issues such as police brutality, sociopolitical problems, and the political instability in Haiti.

== Musical style ==
Tha Rapper Haiti’s musical style is defined by a dynamic fusion of Haitian Creole culture and contemporary hip-hop. His work incorporates traditional Caribbean rhythms, the Creole language, and modern rap production, resulting in a sound that is both culturally rooted and globally resonant. He has been noted for his authenticity, emotional depth, and genre-blending approach, earning praise from music critics for staying true to his heritage while innovating within the hip-hop genre. His style reflects a commitment to elevating Creole hip-hop on the international stage, contributing to its growing recognition across diverse audiences.

== Discography ==
- Twerk ft DNS Soldier (2021)
- Pale vit pale Cho ft Dns soldier (2021)
- I do what I want (2021)
- I see it all (2021)
- Vibe la (2021)
- Ou blesem (2021)
- Merci manman (2021)
- One life to life (2021)
- Bill (2021)
- Vle avew (2021)
- Game kap fet (2021)
- No me importa nada cover French Montana (2021)
- Valide (2021)
- No Chill (2022)
- Thinking about you (2022)
- Mixtape It’s not a Dream Shit gets Real (2024)
