= North Carolina Community College System =

Public community college system in North Carolina, United States

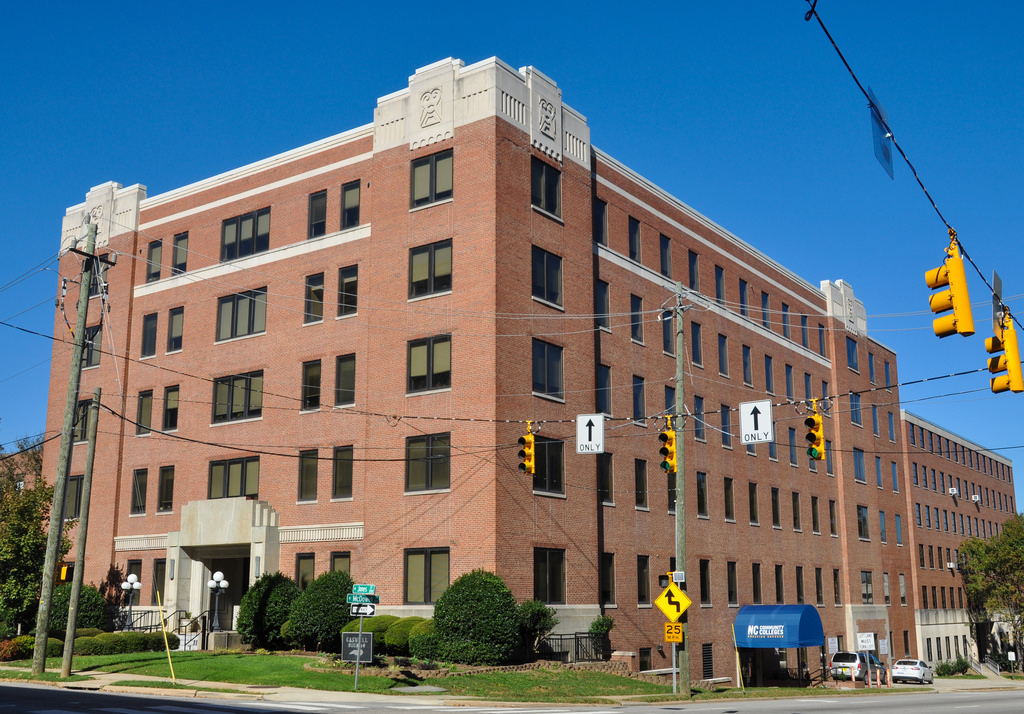
- NCCC System Office in Raleigh, NC
- Type: Community college system
- Established: 1963; 63 years ago
- President: Dr. Monty Sullivan
- Undergraduates: 594,457 (2022–23)
- Location: Statewide, North Carolina, USA
- Campus: 58 campuses
- Website: www.nccommunitycolleges.edu

The North Carolina Community College System (System Office) is a statewide network of 58 public community colleges. The system enrolls nearly 600,000 students annually. It also provides the North Carolina Learning Object Repository as a central location to manage, collect, contribute, and share digital learning resources for use in traditional or distance-learning environments.

== History ==
In the years following World War II, North Carolina began a rapid shift from an agricultural to an industrial economy. With that change came an awareness that a different kind of education was needed in the state. People who did not desire a four-year baccalaureate education nevertheless had the need for more than a high-school diploma.

In 1950, the State Superintendent of Public Instruction authorized a study of the need for a system of tax-supported community colleges. The resulting report, by Dr. Allan S. Hurlburt, was published in 1952. It proposed a plan for development of state supported community colleges. In 1957, the North Carolina General Assembly adopted the first Community College Act and provided funding for community colleges.

The same (1957) General Assembly also provided funding to initiate a statewide system of industrial education centers, to train adults and selected high-school students in skills needed by industry. By 1961, the five public junior colleges were emphasizing arts and sciences, and seven industrial education centers were focusing on technical and vocational education.

In 1961, North Carolina Governor Terry Sanford appointed a Governor's Commission on Education Beyond the High School with Irving E. Carlyle as its chairman. Commonly referred to as the "Carlyle Commission", the body produced a set of proposals in August 1962 aimed at increasing college enrollment in North Carolina. One of its recommendations was the consolidation of the state's "public junior colleges" and "industrial education centers" under a single system of community colleges. In May 1963, the General Assembly responded by creating a Department of Community Colleges under the State Board of Education.

By 1966, 43 institutions had 28,250 full-time equivalent (FTE) enrollments. In 1969, 54 institutions had 59,329 FTEs. The system had grown very rapidly, exceeding 10% annually nearly every year until the late 1970s; in 1974–75, growth reached 33%. The system continues to grow in enrollments nearly every year, but by much more modest margins. The number of colleges has not increased since Brunswick Community College became the 58th in 1978. In 1991, the North Carolina Center for Applied Textile Technology became subject to the management of the North Carolina State Board of Community Colleges. In July 2005, Gaston College, part of the North Carolina Community College System, absorbed the textile center.

The original legislation placed the community college system under the purview of the State Board of Education, and created a State Department of Community Colleges. In the early years of the system, the State Board of Education chairperson was Dallas Herring; David Bruton succeeded him in 1977.

In 1979, the General Assembly changed the state control of the system. Provision was made for a separate State Board of Community Colleges. The board was appointed and organized in 1980, and met several times with the State Board of Education. The new board assumed full responsibility for the system on January 1, 1981. The board's first chairperson was Duke Power Company executive Carl Horn. He was succeeded in 1983 by John A. Forlines, president of Bank of Granite and then by William F. Simpson in 1989. Lt. Governor Dennis A. Wicker served as chair from 1993 until 1999. Dr. G. Herman Porter, former president of Wayne Community College, served from 1999 until 2001. Businessman James J. Woody, Jr., of Roxboro served from 2001 until July 2005. Progress Energy executive Hilda Pinnix-Ragland served four terms from 2005 to 2013. She was succeeded as chair by Dr. Linwood Powell of Fayetteville in 2013. Businessman Scott Shook of Greenville served 2015–2019 as chair. The current board chair is Breeden Blackwell of Fayetteville, a retired school principal and elected city and county official. The board vice chair is Bill McBrayer, a furniture-company executive from Hickory.

In 1988, the North Carolina Community College System celebrated its 25th anniversary, recognizing that in its first quarter century of service, the system had emerged as the nation's third-largest community college network, educating millions of students during its 32-year history and employing thousands of faculty and staff.

== System presidents ==
As of 2024, the North Carolina Community College System has had 11 presidents, originally called directors of the Department of Community Colleges:

- Isaac Ready (1963–1970)
- Ben E. Fountain, Jr. (1971–1978)
  - Charles R. Holloman (acting) (September 1978–July 1979)
- Larry J. Blake (1979–1982)
- Robert W. Scott (1983–1995)
- Lloyd V. Hackley (1995–1997)
- Martin Lancaster (1997–2008)
- Scott Ralls (2008–2015)
  - George Fouts (interim) (2015–July 2016)
- Jimmie Williamson (2016–2017)
  - Jennifer Haygood (acting) (October 2017–April 2018)
- Peter Hans (2018–2020)
  - Bill Carver (interim) (Aug. 1, 2020–Jan. 11, 2021)
- Thomas Stith III (Jan. 11, 2021–Jul. 22, 2022)
  - Bill Carver (interim) (Jul. 25, 2022–June 2023)
- Jeffrey A. Cox (June 2023–June 30, 2026)
  - Bill Carver (interim) (2026)
- Monty Sullivan (August 2026-present)

== Colleges ==
Official name (Previous name)	Official abbrev.	Location	Service Area (Counties)	Enrollment Unduplicated total of curriculum and continuing education students, as of 2022–2023	Founded	Joined system	Former name/predecessor institution (s)	References
Alamance Community College	ACC	Graham	Alamance	12,243	1958	1963	Alamance Industrial Education Center (1958–1963); Technical College of Alamance (1963–1988)	
Asheville–Buncombe Technical Community College	A-B Tech	Asheville	Buncombe Madison	19,023	1959	1963	Asheville-Buncombe Industrial Education Center (1959–1963)	
Beaufort County Community College	BCCC	Washington	Beaufort Hyde Tyrrell Washington	6,800	1963	1967	Beaufort County Extension Unit (1963–1967); Beaufort County Technical Institute (1967–1979)	
Bladen Community College	BCC	Dublin	Bladen	3,014	1967	1967	Bladen Technical Institute (1967–1987)	" />
Blue Ridge Community College	BRCC	East Flat Rock	Henderson Transylvania	10,971	1969	1969	Henderson County Technical Institute (1969–1970); Blue Ridge Technical Institute (1970–1979); Blue Ridge Technical College (1979–1987)	
Brunswick Community College	BCC	Supply	Brunswick	6,206	1979	1979	Brunswick Technical College (1979–1988)	
Caldwell Community College & Technical Institute	CCC&TI	Hudson	Caldwell Watauga	9,421	1964	1964	Caldwell Technical Institute (1964–1970)	
Cape Fear Community College	CFCC	Wilmington	New Hanover Pender	22,963	1958	1963	Wilmington Industrial Education Center (1958–1963); Cape Fear Technical Institute (1963–1988)	
Carteret Community College	CCC	Morehead City	Carteret	5,636	1963	1968	Carteret Extension Unit (1963–1968); Carteret Technical Institute (1968–1979); Carteret Technical College (1979–1987)	
Catawba Valley Community College	CVCC	Hickory	Alexander Catawba	12,702	1960	1964	Catawba Industrial Education Center (1960–1964); Catawba Valley Technical Institute (1964–1979); Catawba Valley Technical College (1979–1987)	
Central Carolina Community College	CCCC	Sanford; Pittsboro; Buies Creek	Chatham Harnett Lee	15,818	1961	1965	Lee County Industrial Education Center (1961–1965); Lee County Technical Institute (1965–1979); Lee County Technical College (1979–1988)	
Central Piedmont Community College	Central Piedmont (current); CPCC (former)	Charlotte	Mecklenburg	45,215	1963	1963	Merger of the Central Industrial Education Center (1959–1963) with Mecklenburg College (1961–1963, formerly Carver College from 1949 to 1961)	
Cleveland Community College	CCC	Shelby	Cleveland	9,705	1965	1967	Cleveland Extension Unit (1965–1967); Cleveland County Technical Institute (1967–1979); Cleveland County Technical College (1980–1987)	
Coastal Carolina Community College	CCCC	Jacksonville	Onslow	11,183	1965	1970	Onslow County Extension Unit (1963–1965); Onslow Industrial Education Center (1965–1967); Onslow Technical Institute (1967–1970)	
College of The Albemarle	COA	Elizabeth City	Camden Chowan Currituck Dare Gates Pasquotank Perquimans	7,699	1960	1963		
Craven Community College	CCC	New Bern	Craven	8,280	1968	1968	Craven Extension Unit (1965–1968); Craven County Technical Institute (1968–1979)	
Davidson-Davie Community College	DDCC	Lexington; Mocksville; Advance	Davidson Davie	11,659	1963	1965	Davidson County Industrial Education Center (1963–1965); Davidson County Community College (1965–2021)	
Durham Technical Community College	DTCC, Durham Tech	Durham	Durham Orange	17,369	1958	1965	Durham Industrial Education Center (1958–1965); Durham Technical Institute (1965–1986)	
Edgecombe Community College (Edgecombe Technical Institute, until 1987)	ECC	Tarboro; Rocky Mount	Edgecombe	5,382	1967	1967	Edgecombe Technical Institute (1967–1987)	
Fayetteville Technical Community College	FTCC	Fayetteville	Cumberland	29,755	1961	1963	Fayetteville Industrial Education Center (1961–1963); Fayetteville Technical Institute (1963–1987)	
Forsyth Technical Community College	Forsyth Tech	Winston-Salem	Forsyth Stokes	20,085	1959	1964	Winston-Salem Industrial Education Center (1959–1960); Forsyth County Industrial Education Center (1960–1964); Forsyth Technical Institute (1964–1985); Forsyth Technical College (1985–1987)	
Gaston College	-	Dallas; Lincolnton	Gaston Lincoln	16,220	1963	1965	Formed by the 1965 consolidation of Gaston College (established as a community college in 1963) with the Gastonia Industrial Education Center (established 1959) and the Gaston Technical Institute (established 1952, formerly the Morehead City Technical Institute from 1947 to 1952). Absorbed the N.C. Center for Applied Textile Technology in 2005 (member of NCCCS from 1972, renamed in 1991 from the N.C. Vocational Textile School, which had been established in 1941)	
Guilford Technical Community College	Guilford Tech, GTCC	Jamestown	Guilford	28,233	1958	1965	Guilford Industrial Education Center (1958–1965); Guilford Technical Institute (1965–1983)	
Halifax Community College	HCC	Weldon	Halifax Northampton	3,717	1967	1967	Halifax County Technical Institute (1967–1976)	
Haywood Community College	HCC	Clyde	Haywood	4,163	1965	1967	Haywood Extension Unit (unit of Asheville-Buncombe Technical Institution, 1965–1967); Haywood Technical Institute (1967–1979); Haywood Technical College (1979–1987)	
Isothermal Community College	ICC	Spindale	Polk Rutherford	5,410	1964	1964	Absorption by Isothermal Community College (established 1964) of the Rutherford Industrial Education Center (formerly the Rutherford Extension Unit established 1962) in 1965.	
James Sprunt Community College	JSCC	Kenansville	Duplin	4,394	1964	1964	Duplin County Extension Unit (1960–1963), branch of Wayne Technical Institute to 1964	
Johnston Community College (Johnston Technical College, until 1987)	JCC	Smithfield	Johnston	12,013	1969	1969		
Lenoir Community College	LCC	Kinston	Greene Jones Lenoir	9,828	1958	1963		
Martin Community College	MCC	Williamston	Bertie Martin	2,508	1976	1976		
Mayland Community College (Mayland Technical College, until 1988)	MCC	Spruce Pine	Avery Mitchell Yancey	3,228	1970	1970		
McDowell Technical Community College (McDowell Technical College, until 1988)	MTCC	Marion	McDowell	5,285	1967	1967		
Mitchell Community College (Mitchell College, until 1973)	MCC	Statesville	Iredell	8,607	1917	1973		
Montgomery Community College (Montgomery Technical College, until 1987)	MCC	Troy	Montgomery	3,082	1967	1967		
Nash Community College (Nash Technical College, until 1987)	NCC	Rocky Mount	Nash	9,165	1967	1967		
Pamlico Community College (Pamlico Technical College, until 1987)	PCC	Grantsboro	Pamlico	1,500	1962	1963		
Piedmont Community College (Piedmont Technical College, until 1987)	PCC	Roxboro	Caswell Person	4,402	1970	1970		
Pitt Community College (Pitt Technical Institute, until 1979)	PCC	Winterville	Pitt	17,359	1961	1963		
Randolph Community College (Randolph Technical College, until 1988)	RCC	Asheboro	Randolph	9,009	1962	1963		
Richmond Community College	RCC	Hamlet	Richmond Scotland	8,076	1967	1967		
Roanoke–Chowan Community College (Roanoke-Chowan Technical College, until 1987)	R-CCC	Ahoskie	Bertie Hertford Northampton	2,361	1967	1967		
Robeson Community College (Robeson Technical College, until 1988)	RCC	Lumberton	Robeson	9,531	1965	1965		
Rockingham Community College	RCC	Wentworth	Rockingham	5,296	1966	1966		
Rowan–Cabarrus Community College (Rowan Technical College, until 1988)	RCCC	Salisbury; Concord	Cabarrus Rowan	20,837	1963	1963		
Sampson Community College (Sampson Technical College, until 1987)	SCC	Clinton	Sampson	5,967	1965	1965		
Sandhills Community College	SCC	Pinehurst	Hoke Moore	10,699	1963	1963		
Southeastern Community College	SCC	Whiteville	Columbus	5,543	1964	1964		
South Piedmont Community College	South Piedmont, SPCC	Polkton	Anson Union	10,761	1999	1999		
Southwestern Community College (Southwestern Technical College, until 1988)	SCC, Southwestern	Sylva	Jackson Macon Swain	7,465	1964	1964		
Stanly Community College	SCC	Albemarle	Stanly	8,734	1971	1971		
Surry Community College	SCC	Dobson	Surry Yadkin	8,802	1964	1964		
Tri-County Community College	TCCC	Murphy	Cherokee Clay Graham	3,088	1964	1964		
Vance–Granville Community College (Vance-Granville Technical Institute, until 1976)	VGCC	Henderson	Franklin Granville Vance Warren	8,352	1969	1969	Vance County Technical Institute	
Wake Technical Community College (Wake Technical College, until 1987)	Wake Tech	Raleigh	Wake	61,923	1958	1963		
Wayne Community College (Wayne Technical Institute, until 1967)	WCC	Goldsboro	Wayne	9,029	1958	1963		
Western Piedmont Community College	WPCC	Morganton	Burke	5,677	1964	1964		
Wilkes Community College	WCC	Wilkesboro	Alleghany Ashe Wilkes	8,149	1964	1964		
Wilson Community College	WCC	Wilson	Wilson	5,591	1958	1963		

== See also ==
- University of North Carolina System
- List of colleges and universities in North Carolina

== Works cited ==
- Link, William A. (2018). North Carolina: Change and Tradition in a Southern State (second ed.). Hoboken, New Jersey: John Wiley & Sons, Inc. ISBN 9781118833605.
