= Isaac Ready =

American college adminastrator (1903–1987)

Isaac Epps Ready

1st President of the North Carolina Community College System
- In office 1963–1970
- Preceded by: Inaugural holder
- Succeeded by: Benjamin Fountain Jr.

Personal details
- Born: December 17, 1903 Johnston, South Carolina
- Died: March 2, 1987 (aged 83) Raleigh, North Carolina

Isaac Epps Ready (December 17, 1903 –March 2, 1987) was the first President of the North Carolina Community College System, serving from 1963 to 1970.

Ready obtained degrees from the University of South Carolina and New York University, working as a teacher and principal in several North and South Carolina school districts from 1925 until 1945, when he became superintendent of the Roanoke Rapids public schools. In 1958, he was appointed to lead a curriculum study for the N.C. State Board of Education, resulting in the 1963 Community College Act that established the community college system in North Carolina. Ready was a co-author of the act. Following his retirement, he was appointed a visiting professor (later, an emeritus professor) of adult and community college education at North Carolina State University.

Academic offices
Preceded by Inaugural holder	President, North Carolina Community College System; 1963–1970	Succeeded by Benjamin Fountain Jr.
