= Montgomery Community College (North Carolina) =

College in Troy, North Carolina, U.S.

Coordinates: 35°22′1″N 79°52′12″W

Montgomery Community College (MCC) is a public community college in Troy, North Carolina. It was chartered in 1967 as Montgomery Technical Institute and is part of the North Carolina Community College System.

The school received its accreditation in December, 1978, from the Southern Association of Colleges and Schools. Montgomery Technical Institute became Montgomery Technical College in 1983, and in September 1987, the name was officially changed to Montgomery Community College.

In 2007, the campus included facilities of approximately 125,000 square feet (11,600 m^{2}) on 153 acres (0.62 km^{2}) of land. The campus has continued to grow and as of 2010 the facilities are now approximately 134,400 square feet (12,490 m^{2}). The campus library includes the Gelynda & Arron Capel Pottery Collection, containing ancient pottery pieces, as well as modern functional and decorative pottery.

== Academics ==
=== Degree-based programs ===
The college offers programs of study within five areas, most offering a choice among an associate's degree, a diploma, or a certificate:

- Arts & sciences
- Business technology
- Commercial technology
- Health/public services technology

=== Continuing education ===
Like most community colleges, the school offers developmental studies courses for those who need to prepare for advanced college work, as well as continuing education courses for business or pleasure. Distance learning programs include options using Internet-based online courses, Ed2Go and Eduwhere, and as of 2017, MCC uses a Blackboard-based learning management system.

In 2017, the institution began work with the North Carolina Department of Transportation Division of Aviation on the development of the North Carolina Public Safety Drone Academy. The academy trains public safety first responders and corrections staff to become FAA-licensed unmanned aerial vehicle pilots.

The college is a National Rifle Association approved training site for both gunsmithing and shooting training programs. Other popular short-term programs include:

- Knifemaking featuring Forged in Fire champion instructors like Burt Foster, Liam Hoffman, and Theo Nazz.
- Taxidermy, including mammals, fish, and fowl
- Drone Flight, including agricultural, photography, and racing applications
- Heritage Crafts, including an extensive offering of pottery, metalworking, and woodworking course

== Apprenticeship Montgomery ==
MCC is the training provider for the Apprenticeship Montgomery training program. Focusing on preparing high school and adult students for employment manufacturing industry, Apprenticeship Montgomery is a partnership among local employers, the college, Montgomery County School, NCWorks, and the North Carolina Department of Commerce.
