= Halifax Community College =

Community college in Weldon, North Carolina, U.S.

- Type: Public community college
- Established: 1967
- Parent institution: North Carolina Community College System
- Accreditation: SACS
- Endowment: 1967
- President: Patrena B. Elliott
- Location: Weldon, North Carolina, United States; 36.4283°N 77.6184°W
- Colors: Blue and green
- Website: www.halifaxcc.edu

Halifax Community College is a public community college in Weldon, a town in Halifax County in North Carolina. Established in 1967, the college is one of the oldest in the North Carolina Community College System. It offers associate degree programs and continuing education. The college serves Halifax County and part of Northampton County with a population of approximately 65,000 people.

== History ==
Halifax Community College was chartered on September 7, 1967, as Halifax County Technical Institute, part of the North Carolina Community College System. It began operations in February 1968 under Phillip W. Taylor, and from June 1968 to April 1977 was located at the old Colonial Manor Hotel property on Highway 301. The current 109-acre campus, centrally located on Highway 158 in Weldon, was purchased in 1972, built in 1975, 1976 and 1977, and dedicated on May 22, 1977.

In 1971, a general education program was added, by contract with East Carolina University. After several years of study, and following legislative approval in 1975, Halifax County Technical Institute added two-year transfer programs to become a comprehensive community college. On July 1, 1976, the institute's name officially changed to Halifax Community College.

The sixth and current president, Patrena B. Elliott, took office January 1, 2023.

== Accreditation ==
The college is accredited by the Southern Association of Colleges and Schools.

== Academics ==
Academic programs are grouped into 4 schools:

- School of College Transfer
- School of Career and Technical Education (CTE)
- School of Health Sciences
- Workforce & Economic Development

== See also ==
- University of North Carolina System
- List of colleges and universities in North Carolina
