= Alamance Community College =

College in Graham, North Carolina, U.S.

Coordinates: 36.0668299°N 79.3571161°W

- Type: Public community college
- Established: 1958
- Parent institution: North Carolina Community College System
- President: Ken Ingle
- Location: Graham, North Carolina, United States
- Mascot: Haw the River Otter
- Website: www.alamancecc.edu

Alamance Community College is a public community college in Graham, North Carolina, with a secondary campus in Burlington. It serves the area of Alamance County and was established in 1958 as part of a statewide system known as industrial education centers.

== History ==
In 1957 the North Carolina General Assembly distributed funds to create a statewide system of vocational schools for industrial training. In 1959 they officially designated industrial education centers. Burlington-Alamance County Industrial Education Center was established in 1958 as the first of school, and one of the first community colleges in the state. It opened with 1,700 students and offering 15 programs.

In 1963 the industrial education centers came under the Department of Community Colleges within the North Carolina State Board of Education, and in 1964 the college was granted the right to award the Associate of Applied Science (A.A.S.) degree (A.A.S.) and changed its name to Technical Institute of Alamance.

In 1971 Governor Robert W. Scott donated 48 acres (190,000 m^{2}) of land to the college, which was used to build a new campus, completed in 1976. In 1977 the college purchased the former Glenhope School in Burlington, renovated it, and renamed it the Burlington Campus of the Technical Institute of Technology. It served mostly as a location of continuing education courses and in 2001 was replaced by a new Burlington Center. In 1985 a new shop building was opened on the Haw River campus. In June 1996, the college constructed a science and technology building on the main campus in Graham.

In 1979, the board of trustees changed the name of the college to Technical College of Alamance, and in 1988 to the current name, Alamance Community College.

In 2006, Alamance Community College officially became the home of an extensive historical collection of papers and records belonging to the family of Governor Robert W. Scott.

In July 2012, the college graduated a record number of students, 821.

== Accreditation ==
Alamance Community College is accredited by the Southern Association of Colleges and Schools.
