= Cleveland Community College =

Public college in Shelby, North Carolina, US

Coordinates: 35.2810°N 81.4930°W

- Motto: "Move Forward"
- Type: Public community college
- Established: July 1, 1965
- Parent institution: North Carolina Community College System
- Accreditation: Southern Association of Colleges and Schools
- President: Jason Hurst
- Location: Shelby, North Carolina, U.S.
- Campus: Suburban
- Colors: Blue and green
- Mascot: Yeti
- Website: www.clevelandcc.edu

Cleveland Community College is a public community college located in Shelby, Cleveland County, North Carolina. It was established in 1965 as the Cleveland County Industrial and Adult Education Center with its first classes consisting of a Licensed Practical Nurse program, two extension classes, and adult basic education classes for adults who had not completed high school.

The school's name was changed first to Cleveland County Industrial Center and later to Cleveland County Technical Institute. The Cleveland County Technical Institute moved into the old county home buildings in 1969. That site serves as the location of today's campus.

The college took on its current name in 1980. It now provides associate degrees, diplomas, and certificate programs, as well as other vocational and general courses. The college holds accreditation from the Southern Association of Colleges and Schools and is a member of the North Carolina Community College System.
