= Jimmie Williamson =

Former community college leader

James C. Williamson
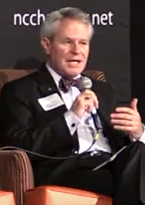
- Williamson in 2016
- Occupation: Higher Education
- Known for: Former president of the united states of the North Carolina Community College System; Former president and CEO of the South Carolina Technical College System

James C. Williamson is the former president of the North Carolina Community College System and the former president and CEO of the South Carolina Technical College System. He was hired on March 31, 2016, to lead the 58-college North Carolina system, beginning on July 1, 2016. He resigned as president of the N.C. Community College System, effective Sept. 30, 2017.

== Career ==
Williamson served for 27 years in higher education in South Carolina, including 20 in the South Carolina Technical College System, rising through roles from registrar to dean to two college presidencies (at Williamsburg Technical College and later Northeastern Technical College) and then to System President in 2014. From 2008 to 2014, he was in a leadership position with Agapé Senior, a healthcare-related industry in South Carolina. While serving in the private sector, Williamson was honored by ASHHRA with the inaugural Gary Willis Leadership Award for outstanding leadership and innovation as a healthcare human resources professional.

Williamson earned a B.V.A and M.Ed. from Winthrop University, and a Ph.D. from the University of South Carolina. He is also a former member of the Winthrop University Board of Trustees.
