= Wake Technical Community College =

Public college in Raleigh, North Carolina, U.S.

- Other name: Wake Tech
- Former names: Wake County Industrial Education Center (1963–1970); W. W. Holding Technical Institute (1970–1973); Wake Technical Institute (1974–1979); Wake Technical College (1980–1988)
- Type: Public community college
- Established: April 3, 1958
- Parent institution: North Carolina Community College System
- President: Scott Ralls
- Students: 72,000
- Location: Raleigh, North Carolina, United States; 35.6504°N 78.7061°W
- Campus: Multiple sites
- Campuses: 7
- Colors: Navy blue and gold Websafe
- Nickname: Eagles
- Sporting affiliations: NJCAA Region X
- Website: www.waketech.edu

Wake Technical Community College (Wake Tech) is a public community college in Raleigh, North Carolina. Its first location, now the Southern Wake Campus, opened in 1963. Wake Tech now operates multiple campuses throughout Wake County. The largest community college in North Carolina, Wake Tech is part of the North Carolina Community College System and is accredited by the Southern Association of Colleges and Schools Commission on Colleges.

== History ==
Wake Tech was chartered in 1958 as the Wake County Industrial Education Center. The school opened its doors on October 7, 1963, with 304 enrolled students. It originally offered 34 curriculum study programs on campus and 270 industrial training programs.

The college was called the W. W. Holding Technical Institute from 1970 to 1973, Wake Technical Institute from 1974 to 1979, and Wake Technical College from 1980 to 1988.

Wake Tech now operates multiple campuses throughout Wake County and is the largest community college in North Carolina. It is part of the North Carolina Community College System and is accredited by the Southern Association of Colleges and Schools Commission on Colleges. Its president is Scott Ralls.

== Campuses ==
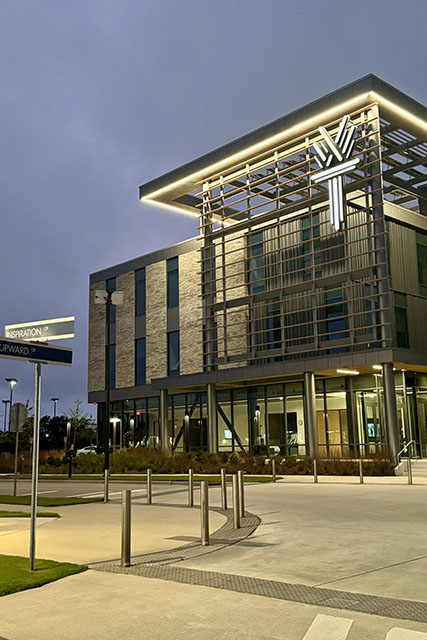
Wake Tech Community College Eastern Wake Campus

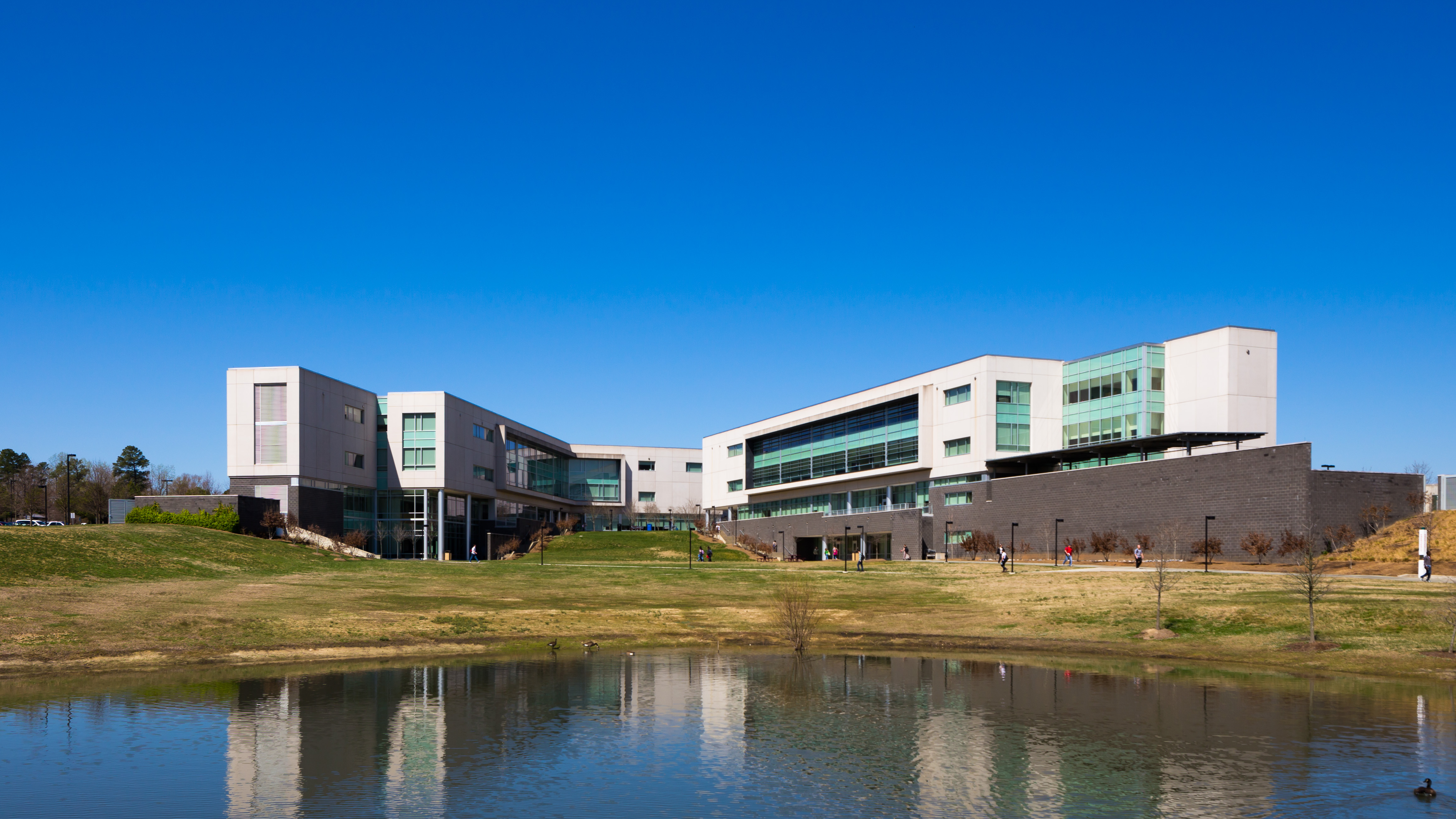
Wake Tech Community College Scott Northern Wake Campus

Wake Tech is located in Wake County and Raleigh, North Carolina. It has seven campuses, one training center, online education and training courses and relationships with four Cooperative Innovative High Schools, as follows:

- Southern Wake Campus – This is the college's original campus. It consists of 139 acres at 9101 Fayetteville Road in Raleigh.
- Beltline Education Center – This center, located at 3200 Bush Street in Raleigh, houses the college's non-degree Workforce Development division.
- Eastern Wake Campus – Located at 5401 Rolesville Road in Wendell, North Carolina, this 106-acre campus opened in April 2024.
- North Wake College and Career Academy – Located at 931 Durham Road in Wake Forest, North Carolina, this career and technical education high school is a collaboration between Wake Tech, the Wake County Public School System and the Wake County government.
- Perry Health Sciences Campus – Located at 2901 Holston Lane in Raleigh, this campus is adjacent to the WakeMed Hospital and focuses on training for health care professionals.
- Public Safety Education Campus – This Commission on Accreditation for Law Enforcement Agencies-accredited training facility is located at 321 Chapanoke Road in Raleigh.
- RTP Campus – This campus was created to serve western Wake County and the Research Triangle Park. It is located at 10908 Chapel Hill Road in Morrisville, North Carolina.
- Scott Northern Wake Campus – This 125-acre campus is located at 6600 Louisburg Road in Raleigh.
- Vernon Malone College and Career Academy – Located at 2200 S. Wilmington Street in Raleigh, this career and technical education high school is a collaboration between Wake Tech, the Wake County Public School System and the Wake County government.
- Wake Early College of Health and Science – Located at 2901 Holston Lane in Raleigh, this early college high school provides training in collaboration with the Wake County Public School System.
- Wake Early College of Information and Biotechnologies – Located at 10908 Chapel Hill Road in Morrisville, North Carolina, this early college high school provides training in collaboration with the Wake County Public School System.
- Wake Tech Online
- Western Wake Campus – This campus offers Associate in Arts degrees and is located at 3434 Kildaire Farm Road in Cary, North Carolina.

== Academics ==
Wake Tech offers associate degrees, diplomas and certificates in 64 programs across 13 career fields. Its most popular degree programs are Cybersecurity, General Business Administration, Accounting & Finance, Computer Programming & Development and Graphic Design. The college has one of the largest Associate Degree Nursing programs in the region, and several of its Health Sciences programs use a competitive-entry system because of the large number of applicants for a limited number of seats. Wake Tech also trains the most first responders in North Carolina.

Wake Tech has nearly 100 fully online degree, diploma and certificate programs, placing it among the top online colleges in the nation. The college also offers more than 850 non-degree courses for workforce training, skills building and personal enrichment.

== Athletics ==
Wake Tech established an athletics program in 2008. The college has nine teams: men's baseball, women's softball, women's indoor volleyball, women's beach volleyball, men's and women's basketball, men's and women's soccer and esports.

Wake Tech's mascot is an eagle named Talon, and its colors are navy blue and gold. The college is a member of Region 10 of the National Junior College Athletic Association (NJCAA).

Wake Tech launched its competitive esports program in 2020 and won the Spring 2021 NJCAAE Overwatch Championship. Teams from the college later won the Fall 2022 Open Division Rocket League Championship and the Fall 2023 and Spring 2024 League of Legends Premier Series Championships.

The Wake Tech baseball team won the NJCAA Region 10 Division II championship and earned a bid to the 2026 NJCAA College World Series.

Beginning in 2026, the baseball, softball and men's and women's soccer teams play home games at Nomaco Park in Zebulon, North Carolina.

== Notable people ==
=== Alumni ===
- Nazmi Albadawi, professional soccer player
- Mike Causey, North Carolina Commissioner of Insurance
- Paul Gervase, professional baseball player
- Mitch Gillespie, former member of the North Carolina General Assembly
- Patricia Hollingsworth Holshouser, First Lady of North Carolina
- Mike McDermott, former member of the Maryland House of Delegates
- Eric Swann, professional football player
- Austin Warren, professional baseball player

=== Faculty and staff ===
- Fred Pickler, actor, author, former deputy sheriff, and former law enforcement instructor
- Scott Ralls, president of Wake Tech and past president of the North Carolina Community College System
- James Roberson, member of the North Carolina House of Representatives; retired senior dean and CCO of Wake Tech's Western Wake Campus
- Dana Trent, full-time Humanities faculty member, author

== See also ==
- List of community colleges
- List of vocational colleges in the United States
- List of college athletic programs in North Carolina
- List of colleges and universities in North Carolina
