= Robeson Community College =

College in Lumberton, North Carolina, U.S.

Coordinates: 34.6708°N 79.0052°W

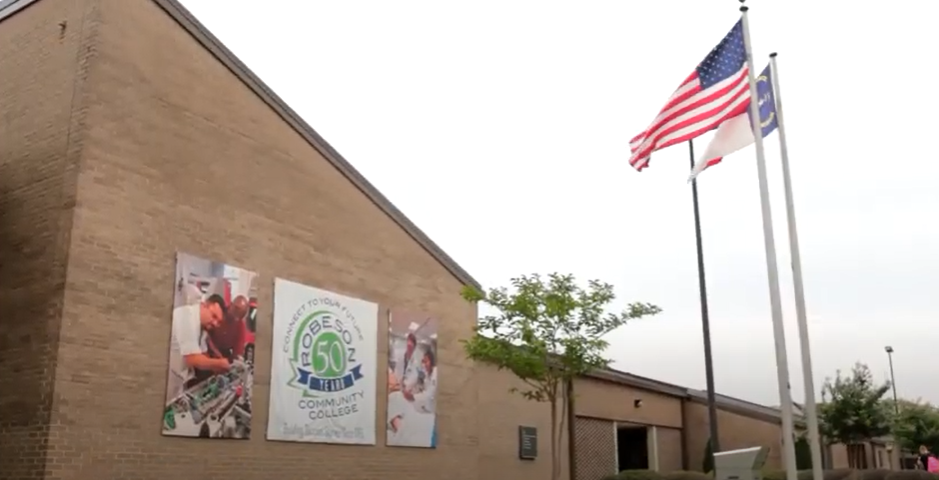
- Type: Public community college
- Established: 1965; 61 years ago
- Parent institution: North Carolina Community College System
- Accreditation: SACS
- President: Melissa Singler
- Students: 1,671 (Fall 2018)
- Location: Lumberton, North Carolina, United States
- Website: robeson.edu

Robeson Community College (RCC) is a public community college in Lumberton, North Carolina. As of Fall 2018, 1,671 students were enrolled at RCC. It is part of the North Carolina Community College System.
