= Edgecombe Community College =

Public college in Tarboro, North Carolina, US

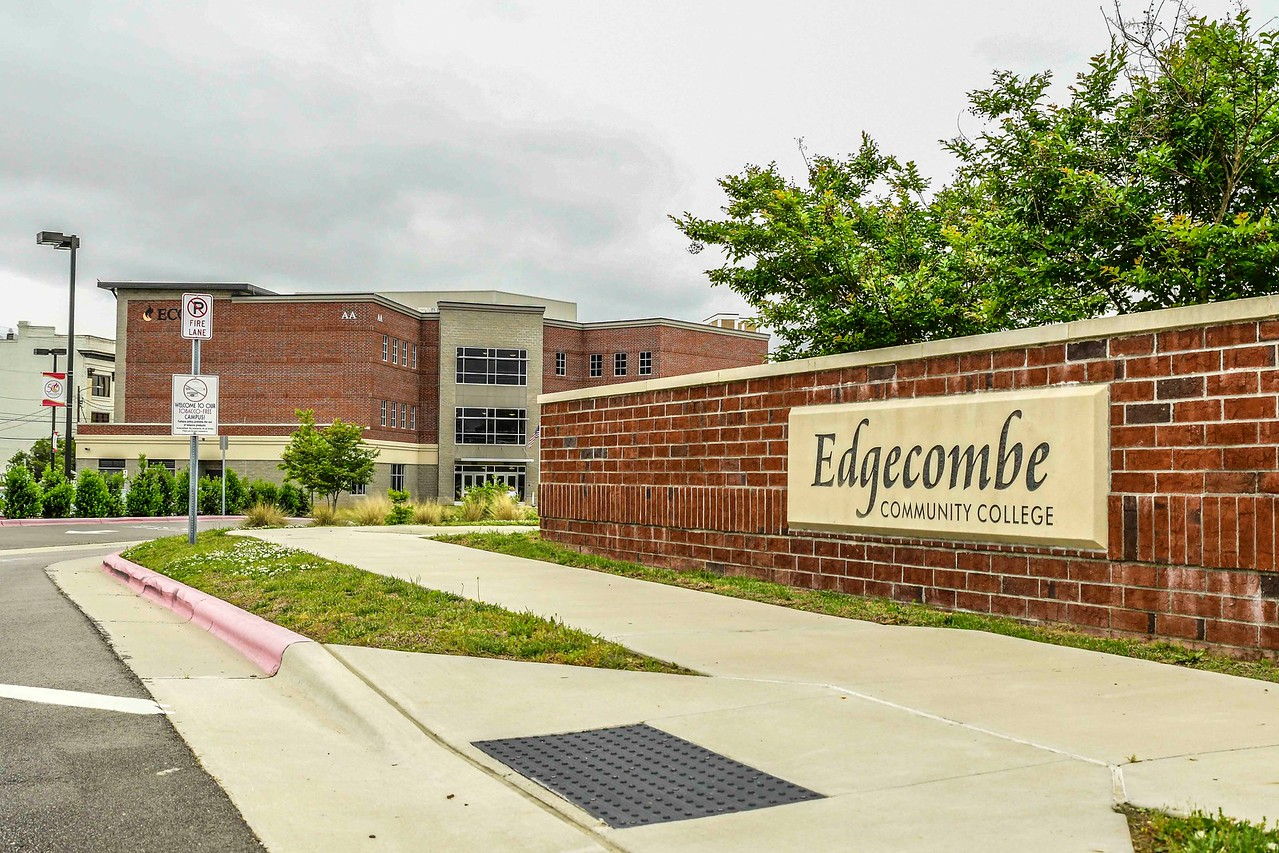
- Campus in downtown Rocky Mount
- Type: Public community college
- Established: 1967
- Parent institution: North Carolina Community College System
- President: Gregory McLeod
- Students: 2151
- Location: 2009 W Wilson St, Tarboro, NC 27886; 35.879307°N 77.573660°W
- Colors: Red and Gold

Edgecombe Community College is a public community college in Tarboro, North Carolina. It is part of the North Carolina Community College System.

== History ==
Edgecombe Technical Institute opened as an extension unit of Wilson County Technical Institute in 1967. In August 1968, the new school held its first classes. In 1987, the college was renamed Edgecombe Community College and has since expanded its campus size. In January 2016, ECC opened a 45,000 sq foot Biotechnology and Medical Simulation Center on the Rocky Mount campus. In 2018, Deborah Lamm retired as president of ECC, eventually being replaced by Gregory McLeod, ECC's first black president.

== Campus ==
The campus spans 120 acres and is located 2.5 miles south of Tarboro and composed of 11 buildings. Edgecombe also operates a separate campus at Rocky Mount.

== Student life ==
The student body is 75% Female, 25% male with over 2000 students. 55% come from out of the county. There is a Travel Abroad Program enabling students and staff to travel to a variety of locations such as France, Spain, Italy and Scotland.

== Academics ==
Edgecombe Community College offers more than 130 academic degree programs, diplomas, and certificates
