= Davidson-Davie Community College =

College in Davidson County, North Carolina, U.S.

- Type: Public community college
- Established: 1958, Industrial Education Center; 1963, Davidson County Community College; 2021, Davidson-Davie Community College
- Parent institution: North Carolina Community College System
- Endowment: $12.0 million (2018)
- President: Jenny Varner
- Academic staff: 241
- Students: 5,798
- Location: Lexington, North Carolina, United States; 35.8655°N 80.1820°W
- Colors: Navy blue, orange, and light gray
- Sporting affiliations: NJCAA, Division II, Region 10
- Mascot: "Stormy" the Cat
- Website: www.davidsondavie.edu
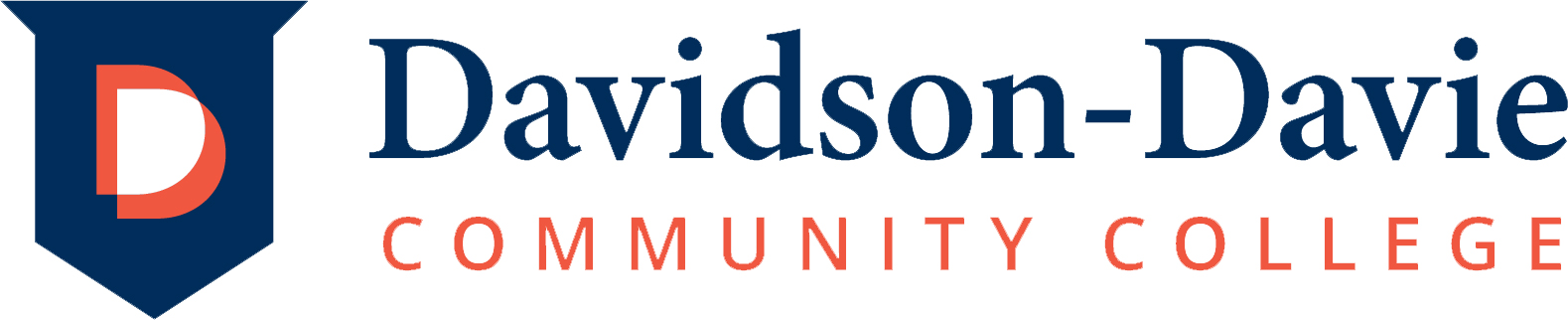

Davidson-Davie Community College (DDCC) is a public community college with campuses in Davidson County and Davie County, North Carolina. It awards certificates, diplomas, and associate degrees in more than 50 programs. As a member of the Comprehensive Articulation Agreement (CAA), between the North Carolina Community College System and the University of North Carolina (UNC) System, credits earned at DCCC transfer to the university system. Davidson-Davie Community College also provides basic skill training and General Educational Development (GED) programs to the public.

Davidson-Davie Community College is accredited by the Southern Association of Colleges and Schools.

== History ==
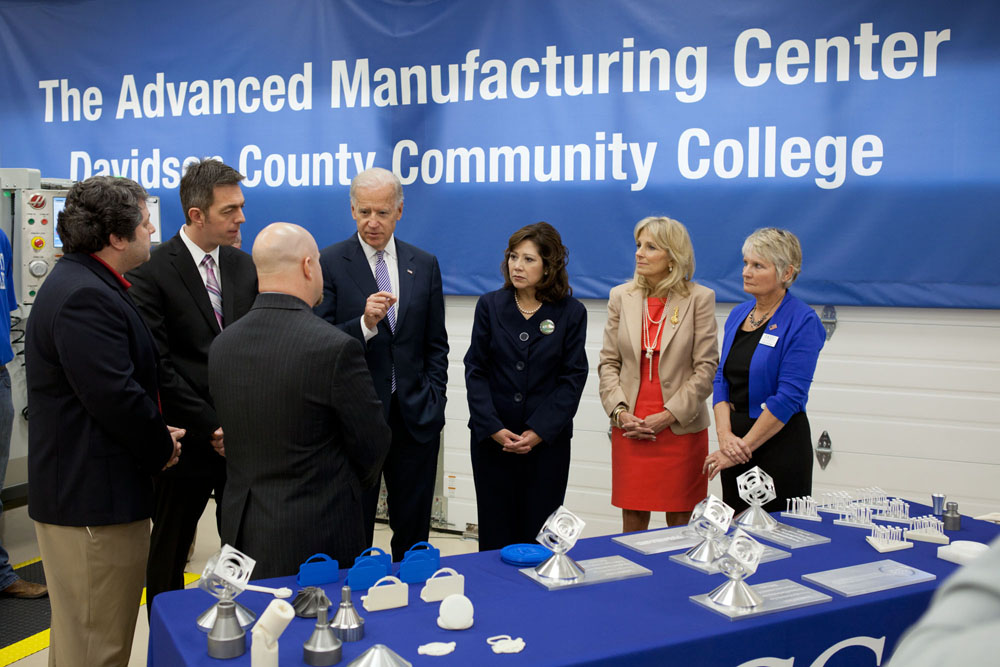
Vice President Joe Biden, Secretary of Labor Hilda Solis, and Jill Biden touring the college in 2012.

Originally chartered in 1958 as an Industrial Education Center DCCC provided education and skills to assist the community in transitioning from an agriculturally based to a manufacturing-based economy. In 1963, enrollment consisted of 51 students in adult education and service programs with 125 students enrolled in vocational and technical courses.

Officially chartered as Davidson County Community College in 1965, the college began offering a larger variety of degrees and certificates including Associate in Arts (AA) and Associate in Science (AS). College transfer courses were added in 1966, and for the Spring 2012 graduating class, nearly 200 students earned the college transfer credential of the AA, AS or Associate's in General Education (AGE) degree.

On January 1, 2021, Davidson County Community College changed their name to Davidson-Davie Community College to better reflect their commitment to both Davidson and Davie counties

Currently, there are several projects planned or currently underway for new facilities on both the Davidson and Davie campuses. Student enrollment continues to expand every year.

== Campuses ==
=== Davidson Campus ===
The Davidson Campus is located in central Davidson County, the Davidson Campus currently has 14 academic buildings. The campus also houses an emergency training facility, a walking track, and a small memorial garden.

The architectural campus design features a central "quad", or courtyard, featuring a large fountain, and tree grove with benches and seating. Each building features a matching brick façade generally using a Modern architectural design.

Services on the Davidson Campus include "The Storm Cellar" (campus dining facility), a student lounge, and the campus bookstore. The two-story Grady Edward Love Learning Resources Center (Library) features Wi-Fi access, a computer lab, and individual study rooms.

The William T. Sinclair building is the original campus building. The Sinclair building is experiencing significant renovation: modern machining classes and the advanced manufacturing program hosted the Vice President in early spring 2012. An automotive bay within the William T. Sinclair building has since been transformed into an aquarium lab that supports the aquarium track of the Zoo and Aquarium (ZAS) associate in applied science degree.

The Davidson campus also sports Davidson Early College High School, an early college program for high school aged students in Davidson County. The program began as a middle college in 2004, before transitioning into an early college in 2006. The program began in the William T. Sinclair building, before moving to the Dr. Edgar Holton Reich Building in 2020.

=== Link Campus ===
In September 2009, the college revealed that a local Lexington family had donated 183 acres (0.74 km^{2}) of land to the college. This donation increased the size of the Davidson Campus from 97 acres (390,000 m^{2}) to 280 acres (1.1 km^{2}). Future plans include athletic fields, additional educational buildings, a renewable pine forest and a sports/conference arena.

=== Davie Campus ===
The Davie Campus, located on 45 acres (180,000 m^{2}) in Mocksville, North Carolina features three academic buildings. Recent additions have added 8,500 square feet (790 m^{2}) of space to the Laboratory building with the first floor of the Community building being renovated to serve as the campus library/computer lab, offering testing, research assistance, printing and copying, and tutoring. In the same style as the Davidson campus, each building features a brick facade in a Modern architectural style.

The Davie campus also fully houses the Cancer Information, Histotechnology, Phlebotomy, Practical Nurse Education and Welding programs. Like the Davidson campus, Davie hosts an Early College allowing students to earn an associate degree as they earn their high school credential.

Services on the Davie campus include a computer lab, library, and several study spaces with vending machines.

=== Other locations ===
The Uptown Lexington Center opened in 2004 on First Street in Lexington, North Carolina. This site provides curriculum, GED, and Continuing Education services.

The Thomasville Education Center (TEC) opened in 2005 on Randolph Street in Thomasville, North Carolina. Like the Uptown Lexington site, TEC offers credit and non-credit courses and GED.

The Davie Education Center a 3,500-square-foot (330 m^{2}) facility next to the Bermuda Run Town Hall opened in 2008. This site provides small business, continuing education, and curriculum courses. An extensive distance learning lab provides access to other courses and programs offered at DCCC or through other locations inside and outside of North Carolina.

== Organization ==
Davidson-Davie Community College is a member of the North Carolina Community College system, a set of 58 community colleges located throughout the state.

=== Administration ===
The Board of Trustees, a set of 14 voting members and the Student Government President (non-voting) elect a president and set policy to drive decisions and address issues facing the college. Dr. Darrin Hartness, the current college president, was sworn in as the fourth president on January 2, 2019.

=== Academic Organization ===
In 2009 DDCC began restructuring their academic organizational structure. Under the Vice President of Academic Programs and Services five schools contain the academic services of the college.

School of Arts, Sciences and Education
English and Reading	Humanities	Social Sciences
Sciences, PE	Mathematics	Teacher Education
School of Business, Engineering & Technical Studies
Business & Computers	Engineering, Industrial, and Transportation	Criminal Justice & Legal Studies
School of Health, Wellness & Public Safety
Health and Wellness Technology	Human Services	Health Continuing Education
Health and Public Safety		
School of Foundational Studies & Academic Support
Developmental Education	Basic Skills	Distance Education
High School Programs	Library Services	Learning Assistance Center
Coaching Centers		
School of Community Education, Workforce Development & Entrepreneurship
Customized Training	Small Business Center	Conference Engagement and Community Engagement

== Academics ==
DDCC has an open door admissions policy, allowing all students who apply to be accepted. However, some programs do have special admissions requirements. Primarily, these are fields where demand for education is high: selected health programs, Basic Law Enforcement training, Truck Driver training, and the Zoo & Aquarium program.

=== Foundation ===
Established in 1968, the Davidson-Davie Community College Foundation, Inc. is a non-profit educational and charitable organization that assists DDCC in the development of college programs, services, and scholarships. It has $9.5 million in scholarships and funds.

Annually, the foundation sponsors various events, fund raisers, and activities. The Scholarship Golf Tournament recruits local businesses and community figures to support and sponsor various holes and players. The 2008 tournament raised $30,000. The other major event, Campus Fund Drive, is a two-week campaign to encourage faculty, staff, and community to donate towards an annual goal. The 2008 CFD goal was $30,000.

=== DDCC Alumni Association ===
The Alumni Association attempts to connect the approximately half million students who attended since 1963. Alumni are asked to volunteer time and support for college events and fund raisers. Alumni are extended various benefits for joining the association including access to campus facilities and services.

== Student life ==
Student Life at DDCC includes over 31 clubs and organizations for students to join including the Student Government Association, an Intercultural Club, SAGA (Sexuality And Gender Alliance), and several other groups specific to a certain major or interest.

Throughout the academic year the Student Government Association hosts Fall Fest and Spring Fling. These events typically include club fund raisers, games for adults and children, and music. The SGA also sponsor several Red Cross blood drives throughout the year.

The Prism Series is a cultural arts program that introduces various art forms to the campus Each week the Prism Series hosts Coffee Hour featuring either a speaker or musical act. The Prism Series also sponsors various speakers and presentations throughout the year for students, faculty, and staff.

Students are encouraged to participate in various campus-wide activities such as the Great American Smokeout, Constitution Day, Campus Holiday Tree Lighting, International week, and events celebrating Black History, Women's History, and Latino History months. Each semester an art exhibit is hosted in the Mendenhall building featuring art from local, regional, and national artists.

Students at the Davidson and Davie Campus have access to a free on-campus fitness facility. On the Davidson Campus a Fitness Specialist is available for fitness program planning and nutritional information.

=== Athletics ===
DDCC's men's basketball and a women's volleyball teams began in 2007 and are part of the National Junior College Athletic Association (NJCAA). Both teams have been successful in their respective games.

In the 2009-10 year, the women's volleyball team reached the National NCJAA Volleyball tournament. The men's basketball team also achieved national ranking by competing in the NCJAA Division III national championship games.

Students admitted to the college who plan to participate in intercollegiate athletics must meet all admissions criteria set forth in the College Catalog. Player eligibility includes standards established by DDCC and NJCAA such as full-time enrollment of 12 hours or more with satisfactory attendance and grade point averages.

Intramural sports are sponsored by the Fitness Center and open to any faculty, staff, or student. Basketball, volleyball, indoor soccer, and dodgeball are offered at various times throughout the year.

Many DDCC sporting events are streamed live on the school's website.
