= Nash Community College =

Public college in Rocky Mount, North Carolina, US, US

- Type: Public community college
- Established: 1967
- Parent institution: North Carolina Community College System
- President: Lew K. Hunnicutt
- Students: 12,000
- Location: Rocky Mount, North Carolina, United States; 35.97752°N 77.901006°W
- Colors: Blue
- Nickname: Nighthawks

Nash Community College is a public community college in Rocky Mount, Nash County, North Carolina. It is part of the North Carolina Community College System. On June 9, 2023, Nash Community College hosted President Joe Biden and First Lady Jill Biden.
