= Rowan–Cabarrus Community College =

College in North Carolina, U.S.

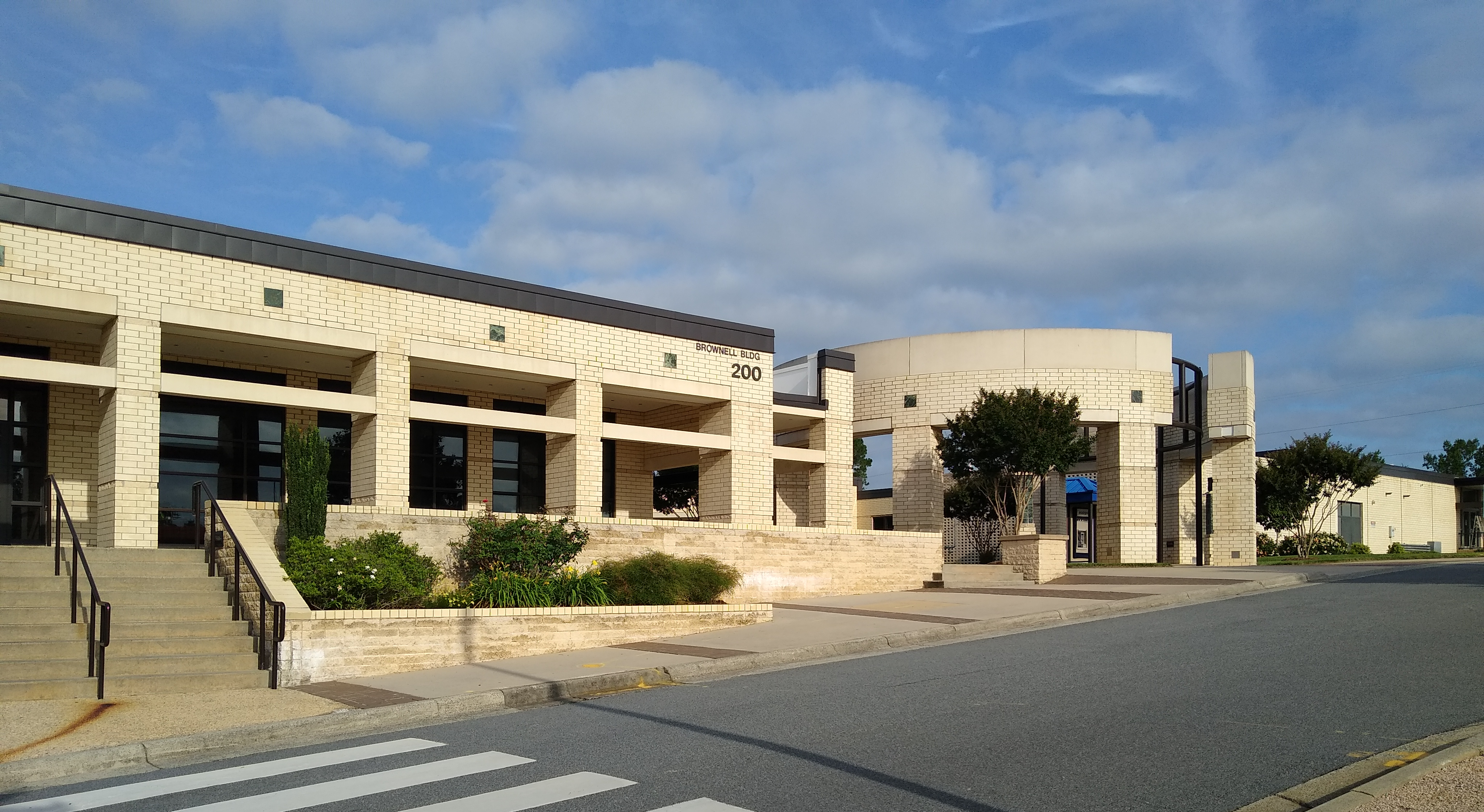
- North Campus in Salisbury, North Carolina
- Type: Public community college
- Established: 1963
- Parent institution: North Carolina Community College System
- Affiliations: North Carolina Community College System
- President: Carol S. Spalding
- Students: 22,000
- Location: Salisbury, North Carolina, Concord, North Carolina, Kannapolis, North Carolina, North Carolina, United States
- Nickname: Warriors
- Website: www.rccc.edu

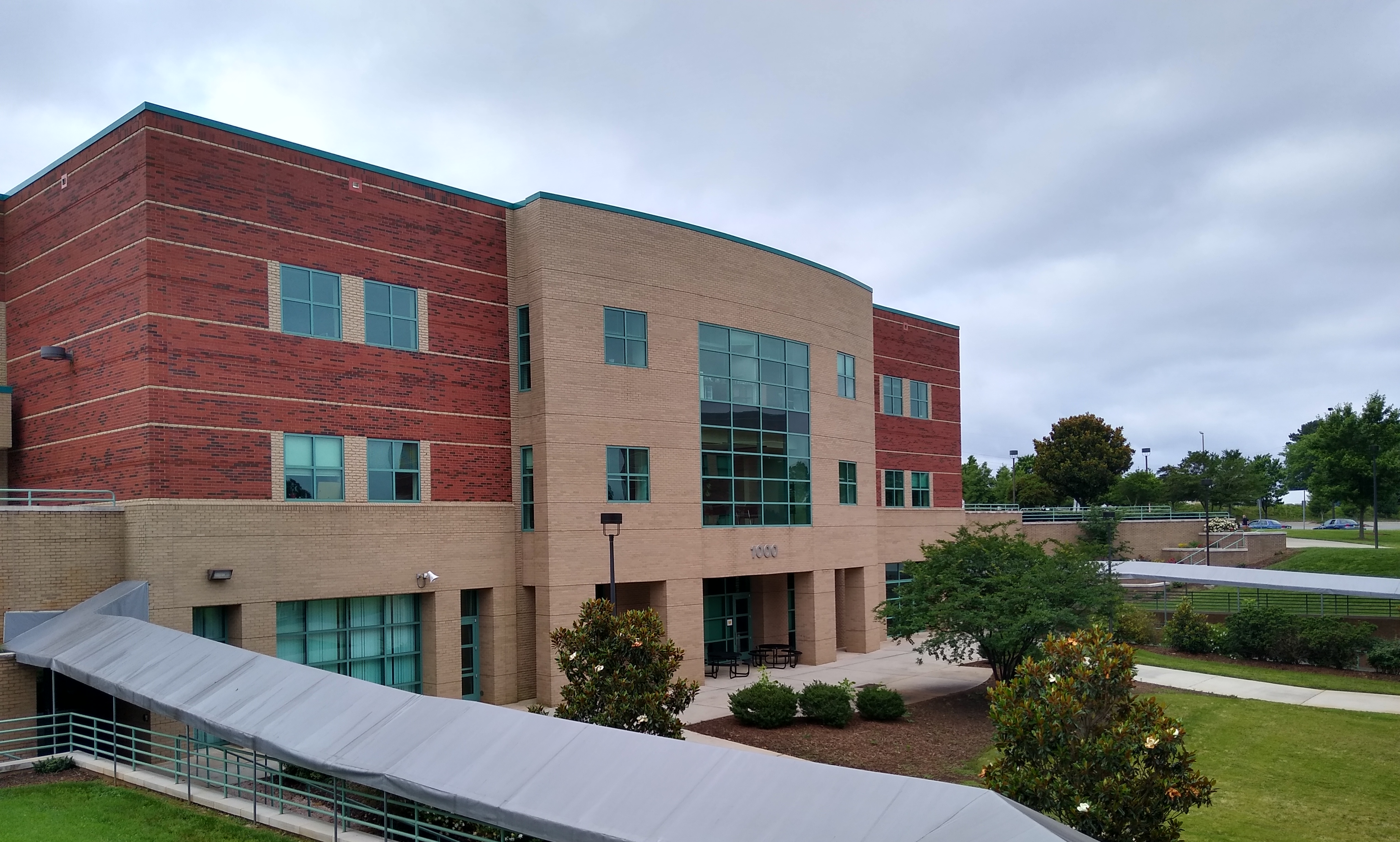
South Campus in Concord, North Carolina

Rowan–Cabarrus Community College (RCCC) is a public community college in Rowan County and Cabarrus County, North Carolina. It is part of the North Carolina Community College System.

RCCC offers associate degree programs in more than 40 areas of study. It also offers accredited diploma and certificate programs focused on career training, continuing education, and basic skills education. RCCC provides a foundation and transferable credits for students advancing to four-year colleges and universities and helps adults receive the additional training they need to start or change careers.

RCCC provides more than 2,000 course offerings, serving a yearly overall enrollment of more than 22,000 students. In addition, RCCC provides the education and job-training programs needed to meet many of the workforce demands of the North Carolina Research Campus being developed in Kannapolis. RCCC offers day, evening and on-line classes for adults.

== Displaced workers programs ==
RCCC established the R^{3} Center in 2007 specifically to assist displaced workers. RCCC's experience working with the thousands of laid-off Pillowtex workers between 2003 and 2005 led the college to develop a new program to serve the unique needs of adult displaced workers.

Located in Kannapolis, the R^{3} Center is a career development center to help adults who are unemployed or under-employed. The center's mission is built on three Rs – a refocus on individual skills and interests, retraining and further education, and partnering with other workforce development agencies to secure career-oriented re-employment.

The R^{3} Center works with other workforce development agencies, including the Centralina Workforce Development Board, JobLink Career Centers of Cabarrus and Rowan counties, N.C. Employment Security Commission and other area community colleges.

In 2010, RCCC founded the Re-employment Bridge Institute (RBI) to share its displaced worker experiences with other community colleges and employment agencies across North Carolina. Through a series of workshops, conferences and on-line programs, the RBI is sharing best practices in responding to the multiple needs of displaced workers. The RBI seeks to share ideas and help local institutions and agencies become catalysts for economic recovery. The RBI was established through a grant from the North Carolina Department of Commerce.

== Continuing and corporate education ==
RCCC's Continuing & Corporate Education programs provide workforce and personal development opportunities in multiple locations throughout Cabarrus and Rowan counties.
