= Rockingham Community College =

College in Wentworth, North Carolina, U.S.

Coordinates: 36.3882805°N 79.7554089°W

- Motto: Start Local, Go Far
- Type: Public community college
- Established: 1966
- Parent institution: North Carolina Community College System
- Affiliations: Southern Association of Colleges and Schools
- President: Mark O. Kinlaw
- Students: 2,254
- Location: Wentworth, North Carolina, U.S.
- Campus: Rural
- Colors: Dark green, orange, gold, white
- Nickname: Eagles
- Sporting affiliations: NJCAA
- Mascot: Eagle
- Website: www.rockinghamcc.edu

Rockingham Community College is a public community college located in Wentworth, North Carolina, United States. It is part of the North Carolina Community College System.
