= Sampson Community College =

College in Clinton, North Carolina, U.S.

- Type: Public community college
- Established: 1967
- Parent institution: North Carolina Community College System
- President: Cameron Pippin
- Students: 2,000 curriculum students
- Location: Clinton, North Carolina, United States; 34.9907°N 78.3601°W
- Campus: Small town
- Nickname: Vikings
- Mascot: Viking
- Website: www.sampsoncc.edu

Sampson Community College is a public community college in Clinton, North Carolina. It is part of the North Carolina Community College System.

== History ==
In September 1965, Sampson Community College was established as an extension unit of Goldsboro Industrial Education Center (Wayne Community College). In 1967, SCC became an independent unit and was called "Sampson Technical Institute", and was later renamed to Sampson Community College in October.
