= Bladen Community College =

Public college in Dublin, North Carolina, US

Coordinates: 34°38′40″N 78°43′53″W

Bladen Community College is a public community college in Dublin, North Carolina. It is part of the North Carolina Community College System and serves Bladen County.

== History ==
Bladen Community College was established on October 5, 1967, as Bladen Technical Institute, and chartered on January 14, 1971, under the authority of North Carolina General Statute 115A. Their athletic program is known as the Eagles.

== Accreditation ==
Bladen Community College is accredited by the Commission on Colleges of the Southern Association of Colleges and Schools to award associate degrees, diplomas, and certificates.

== College information ==
Bladen Community College offers post-secondary certificates, diplomas, and degree programs.
