= Carteret Community College =

College in Morehead City, North Carolina, U.S.

- Motto: Educatio Pro Vita
- Motto in English: Education For Life
- Type: Public community college
- Established: 1963; 63 years ago
- Parent institution: North Carolina Community College System
- President: Tracy Mancini
- Location: Morehead City, North Carolina, United States; 34.7237°N 76.75602°W
- Campus: Small town
- Website: www.carteret.edu

Carteret Community College is a public community college in Morehead City, North Carolina. It was founded in 1963 and serves residents of Carteret County, North Carolina. Carteret Community College is one of 58 institutions comprising the North Carolina Community College System. The college lies on the shores of the Bogue Sound. It is accredited by the Southern Association of Colleges and Schools Commission on Colleges.
