= Pamlico Community College =

Public college in Grantsboro, North Carolina, US

- Type: Public community college
- Established: 1962
- Parent institution: North Carolina Community College System
- Students: 597 (2013-14)
- Location: Grantsboro, North Carolina, United States; 35.0684°N 76.8337°W
- Website: www.pamlicocc.edu/

Pamlico Community College is a public community college in Grantsboro, North Carolina. It is part of the North Carolina Community College System.

== History ==
The college began as an industrial education center in 1962.

== Academics ==
The college has a transfer agreement with Barton College, enabling a student with a 2.0 GPA or higher with all standard admission requirements to be able to transfer to Barton College to complete a Bachelor's degree.
