= Beaufort County Community College =

College in Washington, North Carolina, U.S.

- Type: Public community college
- Established: 1967
- Parent institution: North Carolina Community College System
- President: David Loope
- Location: Washington, North Carolina, United States; 35.5335°N 76.9654°W
- Colors: blue and white
- Website: www.beaufortccc.edu

Beaufort County Community College is a public community college in Washington, North Carolina.

== Academics ==
The college has classes and programs for business and industry services, healthcare programs, human resources development, public safety, and occupational extensions.

== History ==
In December 1967, the College was officially chartered as Beaufort County Technical Institute. The vocational and technical programs of the Institute were complemented by a college parallel program which opened in 1968 in conjunction with East Carolina University. In 1979, community college status was granted.
