= Roanoke–Chowan Community College =

Public college in Ahoskie, North Carolina, US

- Motto: Wave Pride Amplified
- Type: Public community college
- Established: 1967
- Parent institution: North Carolina Community College System
- President: Murray J. Williams
- Location: Ahoskie, North Carolina, United States; 36.324777°N 77.024170°W
- Nickname: Waves
- Website: www.roanokechowan.edu

Roanoke–Chowan Community College is a public community college in Ahoskie, North Carolina. It is part of the North Carolina Community College System.

== History ==
In 1967, an abandoned prison compound in Hertford County was purchased. The North Carolina General Assembly provided a fund to establish a 2-year vocational and technical training institution. The institution was initially founded as a technical institute. In 1981, Roanoke-Chowan Technical Institute was renamed Roanoke-Chowan Technical College. In 1987, the institution was again renamed to Roanoke-Chowan Community College.

== Campus ==
The community college is situated on a 41-acre tract of land and has seven buildings which house instructional space and administrative functions. A seven-acre Arboretum/Environmental Science Outdoor Laboratory is also part of the campus. The college has expanded into the vacant Northampton High School-East building to offer General Educational Development and computer literacy programs. In addition, there are several new programs such as a mechatronics engineering technology program.

== Academics ==
The college currently has about 20 curricular programs in which students may seek degrees, diplomas, and short-term skills-based certificates.
