= Craven Community College =

College in New Bern, North Carolina, U.S.

Coordinates: 35.1115°N 77.1032°W

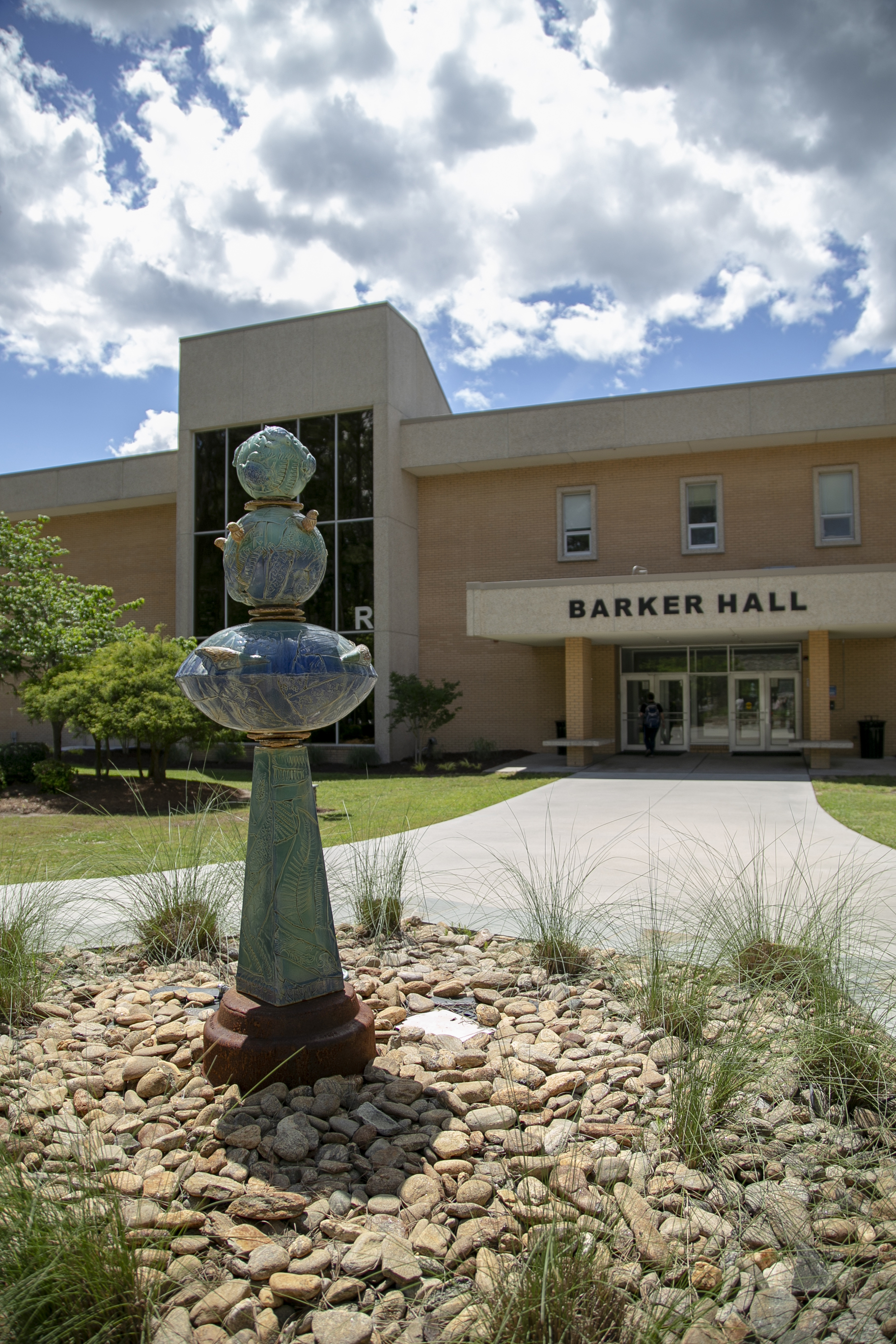
A view of Barker Hall on the New Bern campus of Craven Community College

Craven Community College is a public community college with its main campus in New Bern, North Carolina. It also has campuses in Havelock and Marine Corps Air Station Cherry Point. Established in 1965, it was originally an extension of Lenoir Community College—Craven IEC (Industrial Education Center). It later added degree-awarding programs in several technical fields and became a technical institute. In the early 1970s, college-transfer degrees were added and the school became a community college. It is part of the North Carolina Community College System.

Technical and transfer programs are offered to students. There are three campuses: New Bern (main campus), Havelock and MCAS Cherry Point in Craven County, North Carolina.

== New Bern campus (main) ==
New Bern is where most of the classes and college offices are located; it is also the seat of government for Craven County. The buildings in New Bern house the college studies and student activities. Many students who attend this campus live in New Bern or surrounding areas, including Havelock. The college's students transfer to East Carolina University, North Carolina State University and other UNC system campuses, as well as other four-year institutions. The Bosch and Siemens Advanced Manufacturing Center and a new Business/Information Technology Building were completed in 2008 on this campus.

== Havelock campus ==
The Havelock Campus is primarily known for being the home of the Institute of Aeronautical Technology (IAT). It is close to MCAS Cherry Point and to Fleet Readiness Center East, a naval aviation repair facility providing jobs for graduates of IAT. Several classes are held here, online, Cherry Point campus, or at Havelock High School.

The Havelock campus consists of three buildings: the Craven-Carteret-Pamlico Regional Library, the Lewis Redd classroom and laboratory building, and the IAT. The Redd Building contains the administration offices for the Havelock campus, six computer labs, classrooms, and the Academic Skills Center.

== MCAS Cherry Point campus ==
Located in the Training and Education building on the Marine Corps Air Station Cherry Point, the campus is available to anyone living on the base. Several classes from the Havelock Campus are held here; these can be attended by anyone (with a pass from the Base Pass Office).

== Craven Early College and Early College EAST ==
Craven Early College (CEC) and Early College EAST (ECE) were created out of a strong partnership between Craven County Schools and Craven Community College. The schools are small autonomous high schools on the college campuses (New Bern and Havelock, respectively). Each school accepts 50 students per year, from a pool of applicants that are selected through a lottery system. The schools' small sizes support innovative ideas, creative teachers, and attention to detail. Students who attend will graduate the five-year program with a high school diploma and up to two years of college credit toward a bachelor’s or an associate degree. The structure of the early colleges foster academic acceleration, personalization, and connections to workplace knowledge and skills. The schools are centered on improving graduation rates and preparing students for lifelong learning and entry into high-skill careers.
