= Surry Community College =

College in Dobson, North Carolina, U.S.

Coordinates: 36.3840°N 80.7175°W

- Type: Public community college
- Established: 1964
- Parent institution: North Carolina Community College System
- President: David R. Shockley
- Academic staff: 368
- Undergraduates: 3,236
- Location: Dobson, North Carolina, United States
- Campus: Rural
- Nickname: Knights
- Sporting affiliations: National Junior College Athletic Association
- Website: surry.edu

Surry Community College is a public community college in Dobson, North Carolina. Founded in 1964, it is part of the North Carolina Community College System and serves Surry and Yadkin Counties. It is part of the North Carolina Community College System.

Surry Community College offers thirty-six areas of study, many of which have options for an associate degree, diploma, or certificate, as well as online degrees. The college serves over 18,000 students in over 1,500 classes through their Workforce Training and Continuing Education Division. This area of the college offers a variety of learning opportunities through Workforce and Technology classes for those looking to take a one-time class for personal enrichment or to expand their knowledge base in a particular area.

In addition to its main campus in Dobson, the college operates four satellite centers:

- The Center for Public Safety in Mount Airy,
- The Elkin Center in Elkin,
- The Pilot Center in Pilot Mountain, and
- The Yadkin Center in Yadkinville.
