= Martin Community College =

College in Williamston, North Carolina, U.S.

- Type: Public community college
- Established: 1976
- Parent institution: North Carolina Community College System
- President: Wesley Beddard
- Students: 799
- Location: Williamston, North Carolina, United States; 35.836700°N 77.095002°W
- Website: www.martincc.edu

Martin Community College is a public community college in Williamston, North Carolina. It is part of the North Carolina Community College System.

== History ==
Martin Technical Institute Foundation Inc was founded in 1972 to secure funding for a community college in Martin County. In 1976, Martin Technical Institute changed its name to Martin Community College.

== Academics ==
799 students are enrolled in Martin Community college with a variety of degrees and certificates. MCC is unique among community college having its own equine health program.
