= Lenoir Community College =

Community college in Lenoir County, North Carolina, U.S.

Coordinates: 35.2330156°N 77.571972°W

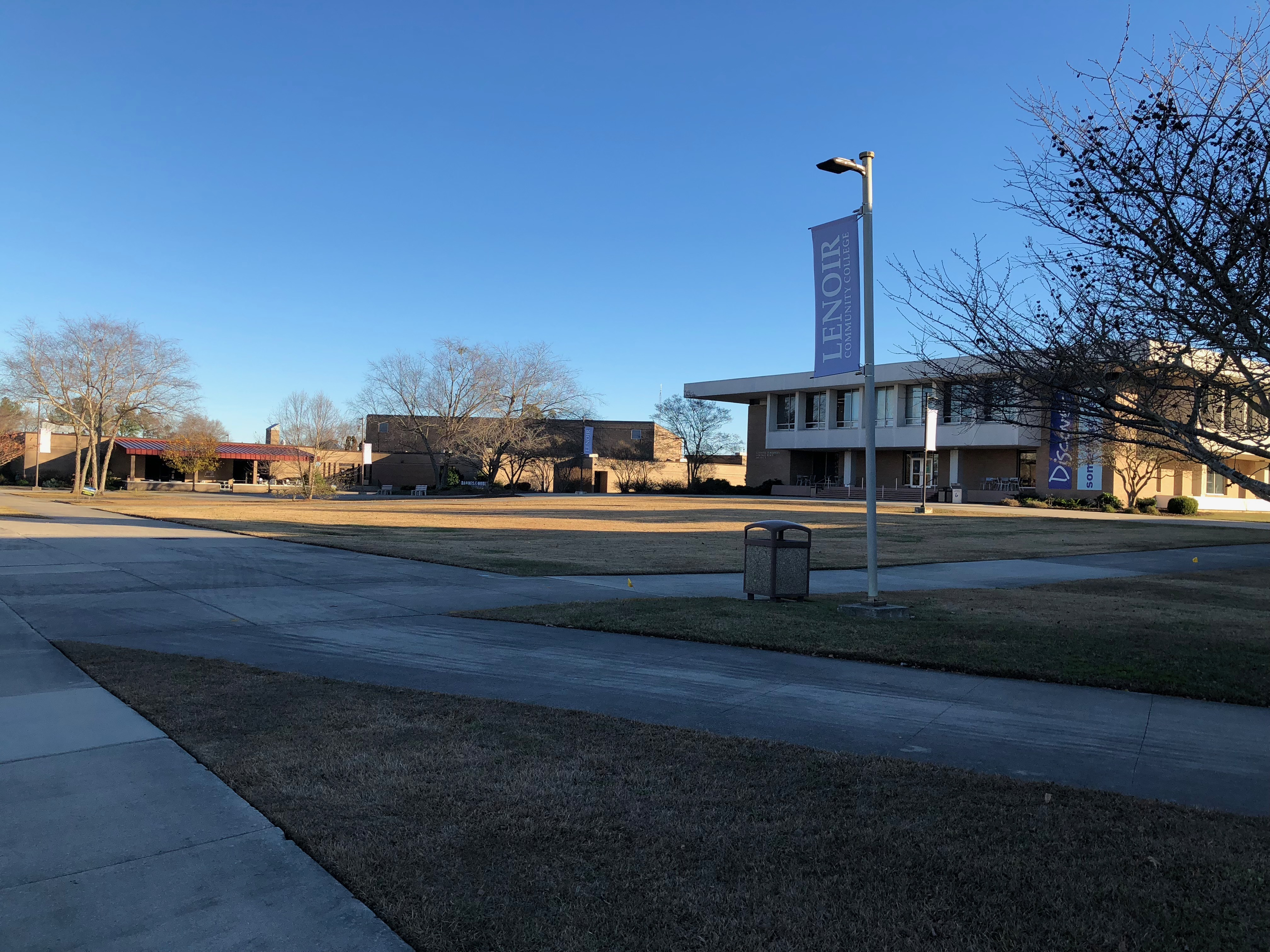
- LCC Courtyard and Learning Resources Center
- Type: Public community college
- Established: 1958
- Parent institution: North Carolina Community College System
- President: Rusty Hunt
- Students: 3500
- Location: Kinston, North Carolina, United States
- Nickname: Lancers
- Website: www.lenoircc.edu

Lenoir Community College (LCC) is a public community college in Lenoir County, North Carolina. LCC's main campus is located in the city of Kinston in Lenoir County and it has satellite institutions in Greene and Jones counties. It is part of the North Carolina Community College System. LCC serves approximately 3,500 curriculum students and 12,500 extension students annually.
