= Wilson Community College =

College in Wilson, North Carolina, U.S.

Coordinates: 35.7298°N 77.8961°W

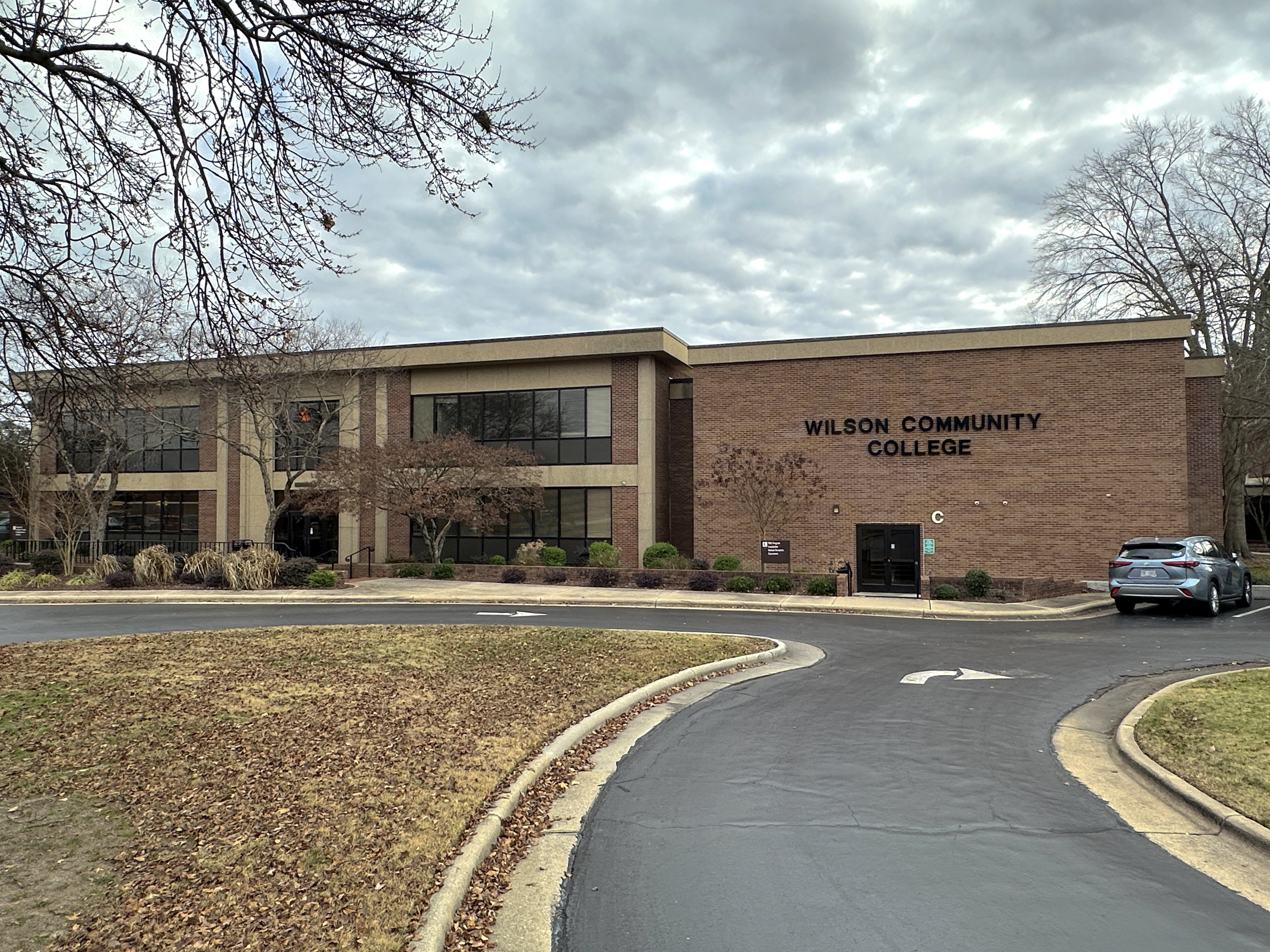
- Entrance to the college in December 2024
- Type: Public community college
- Established: April 3, 1958
- Parent institution: North Carolina Community College System
- President: Jami Woods
- Location: Wilson, North Carolina, United States
- Colors: Dark Purple, Light Purple, Dark Green, and Lime
- Website: www.wilsoncc.edu

Wilson Community College is a public community college in Wilson, North Carolina. It was established in 1958 and is part of the North Carolina Community College System.

== History ==
Wilson Community College (WCC) is a member of the North Carolina Community College System. Established in 1958 as Wilson Industrial Education Center, it is one of the system’s oldest institutions. The first classes began September 29, 1958 in the Charles L. Coon High School Annex. In 1964, the State Board of Education granted authority to award the Associate in Applied Science Degree and the school name was changed to Wilson County Technical Institute. In 1969, the Institute was accredited by the Southern Association of Colleges and Schools. The name was officially changed to Wilson Technical Community College in 1989. In 1993, the Department of Community Colleges granted the College the authority to award the Associate in Arts degree. In 1997, the College converted from the quarter system to the semester system. This change was made in the entire North Carolina Community College System to enhance the transferability of students to four-year institutions. In 2007, the official name of the College was changed to Wilson Community College.

=== Buildings and construction ===
Construction began on the first building on the current site in 1958. Throughout the years since, many buildings have been added and updated to provide more space for additional programs, a student lounge, a bookstore, and more. In 1997, the Salvatore DelMastro auditorium was completed, allowing the old auditorium to be converted to additional library facilities. The Frank L. Eagles Community Business Center addition to Building G was completed in 2003, adding much needed meeting rooms and classrooms to the College facilities. In 2009, the College opened a new student center that showcased sustainable technologies. In March 2019, the newly-renovated Lee Technology Center opened. In 2021, the Library was renovated and renamed as the A. Dwight Johnson Learning Resource Center. Future renovations are currently being planned on both the Herring Avenue and Lee Technology Center campuses. The College continues to expand programs, facilities, and services, to meet the needs of the community.

Building and Construction Timeline
Building	Year Constructed	Square Footage	Usage
A	1958	19,283	Classrooms, Labs, Offices
B	1986	8,494	Classrooms, Labs, Offices
C	1966	9,493	Classrooms, Labs, Offices
D	1968	11,125	Library, Classrooms, Labs, Offices
E	1997	6,749	Salvatore DelMastro Auditorium, Classrooms
F	2009	8,592	Student Services, Offices
G	1981 2003	40,304	Bookstore, Student Lounge, Classrooms, Labs, Offices Frank L. Eagle Community Business Center
H	1965	1,698	Print Shop
I	1965	4,982	Purchasing
J	1968	14,034	Wilson Early College Academy, Classrooms
K	1989	3,340	Classrooms, Labs, Offices
L	1978	7,665	Classrooms, Labs, Office
M	2000	3,767	Maintenance
P	1967	2,248	Police Academy
R	1970, 2016	25,902	Lee Technology Center - Small Business Center, Classrooms, Labs, Offices
W	1970, 2016	9,424	Lee Technology Center - Classrooms, Labs, Offices
X	2007	1,636	Police Academy Annex

*data from 2018 Campus Facilities report

=== Presidents ===
- 1958 – 1971 – Salvatore DelMastro
- 1971 – 1982 – Ernest B. Parry
- 1982 – 2003 – Frank L. Eagles
- 2003 – 2015 – Rusty Stephens
- 2015 – 2023 – Tim Wright
- 2023 - present - Jami Woods

=== Early colleges ===
Wilson Early College Academy (WECA) was established August 5, 2009 on the campus of Wilson Community College. Wilson Academy of Applied Technology (WAAT) was established in 2016 and is embedded on the Beddingfield High School campus and the Wilson Community College campus. Plans are underway for construction of a new building for WAAT, on site at the Lee Technology Center.
