= List of airports by IATA code: M =

The DST column shows the months in which Daylight Saving Time, a.k.a. Summer Time, begins and ends. A blank DST box usually indicates that the location stays on Standard Time all year, although in some cases the location stays on Summer Time all year. If a location is currently on DST, add one hour to the time in the Time column. There are 645 IATA airport codes beginning with M, to be compared with the 676 (26*26) theoretical combinations of the two other letters.

IATA	ICAO	Airport name	Location served	Time	DST
-MA-
MAA	VOMM	Chennai International Airport	Chennai, Tamil Nadu, India	UTC+05:30	
MAB	SBMA	João Correa da Rocha Airport	Marabá, Pará, Brazil	UTC−03:00	
MAC	KMAC	Macon Downtown Airport	Macon, Georgia, United States	UTC−05:00	Mar-Nov
MAD	LEMD	Adolfo Suárez Madrid–Barajas Airport	Madrid, Spain	UTC+01:00	Mar-Oct
MAE	KMAE	Madera Municipal Airport	Madera, California, United States	UTC−08:00	Mar-Nov
MAF	KMAF	Midland International Air and Space Port	Midland, Texas, United States	UTC−06:00	Mar-Nov
MAG	AYMD	Madang Airport	Madang, Papua New Guinea	UTC+10:00	
MAH	LEMH	Menorca Airport (Mahón Airport)	Menorca, Balearic Islands, Spain	UTC+01:00	Mar-Oct
MAI	FWMG	Mangochi Airport	Mangochi, Malawi	UTC+02:00	
MAJ	PKMJ	Marshall Islands International Airport (Amata Kabua Int'l)	Majuro, Marshall Islands	UTC+12:00	
MAK	HSSM	Malakal Airport	Malakal, South Sudan	UTC+03:00	
MAL	WAPE	Mangole Airport	Mangole Island, Indonesia	UTC+09:00	
MAM	MMMA	General Servando Canales International Airport	Matamoros, Tamaulipas, Mexico	UTC−06:00	Mar-Nov
MAN	EGCC	Manchester Airport	Manchester, England, United Kingdom	UTC±00:00	Mar-Oct
MAO	SBEG	Eduardo Gomes International Airport	Manaus, Amazonas, Brazil	UTC−04:00	
MAP		Mamai Airport	Mamai, Papua New Guinea	UTC+10:00	
MAQ	VTPM	Mae Sot Airport	Mae Sot, Thailand	UTC+07:00	
MAR	SVMC	La Chinita International Airport	Maracaibo, Venezuela	UTC−04:00	
MAS	AYMO	Momote Airport	Manus Island, Papua New Guinea	UTC+10:00	
MAT	FZAM	Matadi Tshimpi Airport	Matadi, Democratic Republic of the Congo	UTC+01:00	
MAU	NTTP	Maupiti Airport	Maupiti, Leeward Islands, French Polynesia	UTC−10:00	
MAV		Maloelap Airport (FAA: 3N1)	Taroa Island, Maloelap Atoll, Marshall Islands	UTC+12:00	
MAW	KMAW	Malden Regional Airport	Malden, Missouri, United States	UTC−06:00	Mar-Nov
MAX	GOSM	Ouro Sogui Airport	Matam, Senegal	UTC±00:00	
MAY	MYAB	Clarence A. Bain Airport	Mangrove Cay, Andros Island, Bahamas	UTC−05:00	Mar-Nov
MAZ	TJMZ	Eugenio María de Hostos Airport	Mayagüez, Puerto Rico, United States	UTC−04:00	
-MB-
MBA	HKMO	Moi International Airport	Mombasa, Kenya	UTC+03:00	
MBB	YMBL	Marble Bar Airport	Marble Bar, Western Australia, Australia	UTC+08:00	
MBC	FOGG	Mbigou Airport	Mbigou, Gabon	UTC+01:00	
MBD	FAMM	Mahikeng Airport (Mmabatho Airport)	Mmabatho, South Africa	UTC+02:00	
MBE	RJEB	Monbetsu Airport	Monbetsu, Hokkaido, Hokkaido, Japan	UTC+09:00	
MBF	YPOK	Porepunkah Airfield	Mount Buffalo, Victoria, Australia	UTC+10:00	Oct-Apr
MBG	KMBG	Mobridge Municipal Airport	Mobridge, South Dakota, United States	UTC−06:00	Mar-Nov
MBH	YMYB	Maryborough Airport	Maryborough, Queensland, Australia	UTC+10:00	
MBI	HTMB	Mbeya Airport	Mbeya, Tanzania	UTC+03:00	
MBJ	MKJS	Sangster International Airport	Montego Bay, Jamaica	UTC−05:00	
MBK	SWXM	Orlando Villas-Bôas Regional Airport	Matupá, Mato Grosso, Brazil	UTC−04:00	
MBL	KMBL	Manistee County Blacker Airport	Manistee, Michigan, United States	UTC−05:00	Mar-Nov
MBM		Mkambati Airport	Mkambati, South Africa	UTC+02:00	
MBN		Mount Barnett Airport	Mount Barnett, Western Australia, Australia	UTC+08:00	
MBO	RPUM	Mamburao Airport	Mamburao, Philippines	UTC+08:00	
MBP	SPBB	Moyobamba Airport	Moyobamba, Peru	UTC−05:00	
MBQ	HUMA	Mbarara Airport	Mbarara, Uganda	UTC+03:00	
MBR	GQNU	M'Bout Airport	M'Bout, Mauritania	UTC±00:00	
MBS	KMBS	MBS International Airport	Saginaw / Midland / Bay City, Michigan, United States	UTC−05:00	Mar-Nov
MBT	RPVJ	Moises R. Espinosa Airport (Masbate Airport)	Masbate, Philippines	UTC+08:00	
MBU	AGGI	Mbambanakira Airport	Mbambanakira, Solomon Islands	UTC+11:00	
MBV		Masa Airport	Masa, Papua New Guinea	UTC+10:00	
MBW	YMMB	Moorabbin Airport	Melbourne, Victoria, Australia	UTC+10:00	Oct-Apr
MBX	LJMB	Maribor Edvard Rusjan Airport	Maribor, Slovenia	UTC+01:00	Mar-Oct
MBY	KMBY	Omar N. Bradley Airport	Moberly, Missouri, United States	UTC−06:00	Mar-Nov
MBZ	SWMW	Maués Airport	Maués, Amazonas, Brazil	UTC−04:00	
-MC-
MCA	GUMA	Macenta Airport	Macenta, Guinea	UTC±00:00	
MCB	KMCB	McComb–Pike County Airport (John E. Lewis Field)	McComb, Mississippi, United States	UTC−06:00	Mar-Nov
MCC	KMCC	McClellan Airfield	Sacramento, California, United States	UTC−08:00	Mar-Nov
MCD	KMCD	Mackinac Island Airport	Mackinac Island, Michigan, United States	UTC−05:00	Mar-Nov
MCE	KMCE	Merced Regional Airport (MacReady Field)	Merced, California, United States	UTC−08:00	Mar-Nov
MCF	KMCF	MacDill Air Force Base	Tampa, Florida, United States	UTC−05:00	Mar-Nov
MCG	PAMC	McGrath Airport	McGrath, Alaska, United States	UTC−09:00	Mar-Nov
MCH	SEMH	General Manuel Serrano Airport	Machala, Ecuador	UTC−05:00	
MCI	KMCI	Kansas City International Airport	Kansas City, Missouri, United States	UTC−06:00	Mar-Nov
MCJ	SKLM	Jorge Isaacs Airport (La Mina Airport)	Maicao, Colombia	UTC−05:00	
MCK	KMCK	McCook Ben Nelson Regional Airport	McCook, Nebraska, United States	UTC−06:00	Mar-Nov
MCL	PAIN	McKinley National Park Airport (FAA: INR)	McKinley Park, Alaska, United States	UTC−09:00	Mar-Nov
MCN	KMCN	Middle Georgia Regional Airport	Macon, Georgia, United States	UTC−05:00	Mar-Nov
MCO	KMCO	Orlando International Airport	Orlando, Florida, United States	UTC−05:00	Mar-Nov
MCP	SBMQ	Alberto Alcolumbre International Airport	Macapá, Amapá, Brazil	UTC−03:00	
MCQ	LHMC	Miskolc Airport	Miskolc, Hungary	UTC+01:00	Mar-Oct
MCS	SARM	Monte Caseros Airport	Monte Caseros, Corrientes, Argentina	UTC−03:00	
MCT	OOMS	Muscat International Airport	Muscat, Oman	UTC+04:00	
MCU	LFBK	Montluçon – Guéret Airport	Montluçon, Auvergne, France	UTC+01:00	Mar-Oct
MCV	YMHU	McArthur River Mine Airport	McArthur River, Northern Territory, Australia	UTC+09:30	
MCW	KMCW	Mason City Municipal Airport	Mason City, Iowa, United States	UTC−06:00	Mar-Nov
MCX	URML	Uytash Airport	Makhachkala, Dagestan, Russia	UTC+03:00	
MCY	YBSU	Sunshine Coast Airport	Sunshine Coast, Queensland, Australia	UTC+10:00	
MCZ	SBMO	Zumbi dos Palmares International Airport	Maceió, Alagoas, Brazil	UTC−03:00	
-MD-
MDB	MZML	Melinda Airport	Melinda, Belize	UTC−06:00	
MDC	WAMM	Sam Ratulangi International Airport	Manado, Indonesia	UTC+08:00	
MDD	KMDD	Midland Airpark	Midland, Texas, United States	UTC−06:00	Mar-Nov
MDE	SKRG	José María Córdova International Airport	Medellín, Colombia	UTC−05:00	
MDF	KMDZ	Taylor County Airport	Medford, Wisconsin, United States	UTC−06:00	Mar-Nov
MDG	ZYMD	Mudanjiang Hailang Airport	Mudanjiang, Heilongjiang, China	UTC+08:00	
MDH	KMDH	Southern Illinois Airport	Carbondale / Murphysboro, Illinois, United States	UTC−06:00	Mar-Nov
MDI	DNMK	Makurdi Airport	Makurdi, Nigeria	UTC+01:00	
MDJ		Madras Municipal Airport (FAA: S33)	Madras, Oregon, United States	UTC−08:00	Mar-Nov
MDK	FZEA	Mbandaka Airport	Mbandaka, Democratic Republic of the Congo	UTC+01:00	
MDL	VYMD	Mandalay International Airport	Mandalay, Myanmar	UTC+06:30	
MDM		Munduku Airport	Munduku, Papua New Guinea	UTC+10:00	
MDN	KIMS	Madison Municipal Airport	Madison, Indiana, United States	UTC−05:00	Mar-Nov
MDO	PAMD	Middleton Island Airport	Middleton Island, Alaska, United States	UTC−09:00	Mar-Nov
MDP	WAKD	Mindiptana Airport	Mindiptana, Indonesia	UTC+09:00	
MDQ	SAZM	Astor Piazzolla International Airport	Mar del Plata, Buenos Aires, Argentina	UTC−03:00	
MDS	MBMC	Middle Caicos Airport	Middle Caicos, British Overseas Territory of Turks and Caicos Islands	UTC−04:00	
MDT	KMDT	Harrisburg International Airport	Harrisburg, Pennsylvania, United States	UTC−05:00	Mar-Nov
MDU	AYMN	Mendi Airport	Mendi, Papua New Guinea	UTC+10:00	
MDV		Médouneu Airport	Médouneu, Gabon	UTC+01:00	
MDW	KMDW	Midway International Airport	Chicago, Illinois, United States	UTC−06:00	Mar-Nov
MDX	SATM	Mercedes Airport	Mercedes, Corrientes, Argentina	UTC−03:00	
MDY	PMDY	Henderson Field	Sand Island, Midway Atoll, United States	UTC−11:00	
MDZ	SAME	Gov. Francisco Gabrielli International Airport (El Plumerillo)	Mendoza, Mendoza, Argentina	UTC−03:00	
-ME-
MEA	SBME	Benedito Lacerda Airport	Macaé, Rio de Janeiro, Brazil	UTC−03:00	
MEB	YMEN	Essendon Airport	Melbourne, Victoria, Australia	UTC+10:00	Oct-Apr
MEC	SEMT	Eloy Alfaro International Airport	Manta, Ecuador	UTC−05:00	
MED	OEMA	Prince Mohammad bin Abdulaziz Airport	Medina, Saudi Arabia	UTC+03:00	
MEE	NWWR	Maré Airport	Maré, Loyalty Islands, New Caledonia	UTC+11:00	
MEF		Melfi Airport	Melfi, Chad	UTC+01:00	
MEG	FNMA	Malanje Airport	Malanje, Angola	UTC+01:00	
MEH	ENMH	Mehamn Airport	Mehamn, Norway	UTC+01:00	Mar-Oct
MEI	KMEI	Meridian Regional Airport (Key Field)	Meridian, Mississippi, United States	UTC−06:00	Mar-Nov
MEJ	KGKJ	Port Meadville Airport (FAA: GKJ)	Meadville, Pennsylvania, United States	UTC−05:00	Mar-Nov
MEK	GMFM	Bassatine Air Base	Meknes, Morocco	UTC±00:00	Mar-Oct^{4}
MEL	YMML	Melbourne Airport	Melbourne, Victoria, Australia	UTC+10:00	Oct-Apr
MEM	KMEM	Memphis International Airport	Memphis, Tennessee, United States	UTC−06:00	Mar-Nov
MEN	LFNB	Brenoux Airport	Mende, Languedoc-Roussillon, France	UTC+01:00	Mar-Oct
MEO	KMQI	Dare County Regional Airport (FAA: MQI)	Manteo, North Carolina, United States	UTC−05:00	Mar-Nov
MEP	WMAU	Mersing Airport	Mersing, Johor, Malaysia	UTC+08:00	
MEQ	WITC	Cut Nyak Dhien Airport	Meulaboh, Indonesia	UTC+07:00	
MER	KMER	Castle Airport	Merced, California, United States	UTC−08:00	Mar-Nov
MES	WIMK	Soewondo Air Force Base	Medan, Indonesia	UTC+07:00	
MET	YMOT	Moreton Airport	Moreton, Queensland, Australia	UTC+10:00	
MEU	SBMD	Serra do Areão Airport	Monte Dourado, Pará, Brazil	UTC−03:00	
MEV	KMEV	Minden–Tahoe Airport	Minden, Nevada, United States	UTC−08:00	Mar-Nov
MEW	FZVM	Mweka Airport	Mweka, Democratic Republic of the Congo	UTC+02:00	
MEX	MMMX	Mexico City International Airport	Mexico City, Mexico	UTC−06:00	Apr-Oct
MEY	VNMG	Meghauli Airport	Meghauli, Nepal	UTC+05:45	
MEZ	FAMS	Messina Airport	Messina, South Africa	UTC+02:00	
-MF-
MFA	HTMA	Mafia Airport	Mafia Island, Tanzania	UTC+03:00	
MFB		Monfort Airport	Monfort, Colombia	UTC−05:00	
MFC	FXMF	Mafeteng Airport	Mafeteng, Lesotho	UTC+02:00	
MFD	KMFD	Mansfield Lahm Regional Airport	Mansfield, Ohio, United States	UTC−05:00	Mar-Nov
MFE	KMFE	McAllen Miller International Airport	McAllen, Texas, United States	UTC−06:00	Mar-Nov
MFF	FOOD	Moanda Airport	Moanda, Gabon	UTC+01:00	
MFG	OPMF	Muzaffarabad Airport	Muzaffarabad, Pakistan	UTC+05:00	
MFH		Mesquite Airport (FAA: 67L)	Mesquite, Nevada, United States	UTC−08:00	Mar-Nov
MFI	KMFI	Marshfield Municipal Airport	Marshfield, Wisconsin, United States	UTC−06:00	Mar-Nov
MFJ	NFMO	Moala Airport	Moala Island, Fiji	UTC+12:00	Nov-Jan
MFK	RCMT	Matsu Beigan Airport	Beigan, Taiwan	UTC+08:00	
MFL		Mount Full Stop Airport	Wandovale, Queensland, Australia	UTC+10:00	
MFM	VMMC	Macau International Airport	Macau	UTC+08:00	
MFN	NZMF	Milford Sound Airport	Milford Sound, New Zealand	UTC+12:00	Sep-Apr
MFO		Manguna Airport	Manguna, Papua New Guinea	UTC+10:00	
MFP	YMCR	Manners Creek Airport	Manners Creek Station, Northern Territory, Australia	UTC+09:30	
MFQ	DRRM	Maradi Airport	Maradi, Niger	UTC+01:00	
MFR	KMFR	Rogue Valley International–Medford Airport	Medford, Oregon, United States	UTC−08:00	Mar-Nov
MFS	SKMF	Miraflores Airport	Miraflores, Colombia	UTC−05:00	
MFU	FLMF	Mfuwe Airport	Mfuwe, Zambia	UTC+02:00	
MFV	KMFV	Accomack County Airport	Melfa, Virginia, United States	UTC−05:00	Mar-Nov
MFW		Magaruque Airport	Magaruque Island, Mozambique	UTC+02:00	
MFX	LFKX	Méribel Altiport	Méribel, Rhône-Alpes, France	UTC+01:00	Mar-Oct
MFY		Mayfa'ah Airport	Mayfa'ah, Yemen	UTC+03:00	
MFZ		Meselia Airport	Meselia, Papua New Guinea	UTC+10:00	
-MG-
MGA	MNMG	Augusto C. Sandino International Airport	Managua, Nicaragua	UTC−06:00	
MGB	YMTG	Mount Gambier Airport	Mount Gambier, South Australia, Australia	UTC+09:30	Oct-Apr
MGC	KMGC	Michigan City Municipal Airport	Michigan City, Indiana, United States	UTC−06:00	Mar-Nov
MGD	SLMG	Magdalena Airport	Magdalena, Bolivia	UTC−04:00	
MGE	KMGE	Dobbins Air Reserve Base	Marietta, Georgia, United States	UTC−05:00	Mar-Nov
MGF	SBMG	Sílvio Name Júnior Regional Airport	Maringá, Paraná, Brazil	UTC−03:00	
MGG		Margarima Airport	Margarima, Papua New Guinea	UTC+10:00	
MGH	FAMG	Margate Airport	Margate, South Africa	UTC+02:00	
MGI		Aransas National Wildlife Refuge Airport (FAA: XS10)	Matagorda Island, Texas, United States	UTC−06:00	Mar-Nov
MGJ	KMGJ	Orange County Airport	Montgomery, New York, United States	UTC−05:00	Mar-Nov
MGK	VYMT	Mong Ton Airport	Mong Ton, Myanmar	UTC+06:30	
MGL	EDLN	Düsseldorf Mönchengladbach Airport	Mönchengladbach, North Rhine-Westphalia, Germany	UTC+01:00	Mar-Oct
MGM	KMGM	Montgomery Regional Airport (Dannelly Field)	Montgomery, Alabama, United States	UTC−06:00	Mar-Nov
MGN	SKMG	Baracoa Regional Airport	Magangué, Colombia	UTC−05:00	
MGO		Manega Airport	Manega, Gabon	UTC+01:00	
MGP		Manga Airport	Manga, Papua New Guinea	UTC+10:00	
MGQ	HCMM	Aden Adde International Airport	Mogadishu, Somalia	UTC+03:00	
MGR	KMGR	Moultrie Municipal Airport	Moultrie, Georgia, United States	UTC−05:00	Mar-Nov
MGS	NCMG	Mangaia Airport	Mangaia Island, Cook Islands	UTC−10:00	
MGT	YMGB	Milingimbi Airport	Milingimbi Island, Northern Territory, Australia	UTC+09:30	
MGU	VYMN	Manaung Airport	Manaung, Myanmar	UTC+06:30	
MGV	YMGR	Margaret River Station Airport	Margaret River Station, Western Australia, Australia	UTC+08:00	
MGW	KMGW	Morgantown Municipal Airport (Walter L. Bill Hart Field)	Morgantown, West Virginia, United States	UTC−05:00	Mar-Nov
MGX	FOGI	Moabi Airport	Moabi, Gabon	UTC+01:00	
MGY	KMGY	Dayton–Wright Brothers Airport	Dayton, Ohio, United States	UTC−05:00	Mar-Nov
MGZ	VYME	Myeik Airport	Myeik, Myanmar	UTC+06:30	
-MH-
MHA	SYMD	Mahdia Airport	Mahdia, Guyana	UTC−04:00	
MHC	SCPQ	Mocopulli Airport	Castro, Chile	UTC−04:00	Aug-May
MHD	OIMM	Mashhad International Airport (Shahid Hashemi Nejad Airport)	Mashhad, Iran	UTC+03:30	Mar-Sep
MHE	KMHE	Mitchell Municipal Airport	Mitchell, South Dakota, United States	UTC−06:00	Mar-Nov
MHF		Morichal Airport	Morichal, Colombia	UTC−05:00	
MHG	EDFM	Mannheim City Airport	Mannheim, Baden-Württemberg, Germany	UTC+01:00	Mar-Oct
MHH	MYAM	Marsh Harbour Airport	Marsh Harbour, Abaco Islands, Bahamas	UTC−05:00	Mar-Nov
MHI	HDMO	Moucha Airport	Moucha Island, Djibouti	UTC+03:00	
MHK	KMHK	Manhattan Regional Airport	Manhattan, Kansas, United States	UTC−06:00	Mar-Nov
MHL	KMHL	Marshall Memorial Municipal Airport	Marshall, Missouri, United States	UTC−06:00	Mar-Nov
MHN	KMHN	Hooker County Airport	Mullen, Nebraska, United States	UTC−07:00	Mar-Nov
MHO	YMHO	Mount House Airport	Mount House Station, Western Australia, Australia	UTC+08:00	
MHP	UMMM	~~Minsk-1 Airport~~ (closed 2015)	~~Minsk, Belarus~~	UTC+03:00	
MHQ	EFMA	Mariehamn Airport	Mariehamn, Åland, Finland	UTC+02:00	Mar-Oct
MHR	KMHR	Sacramento Mather Airport	Sacramento, California, United States	UTC−08:00	Mar-Nov
MHS		Dunsmuir Municipal-Mott Airport (FAA: 1O6)	Mount Shasta, California, United States	UTC−08:00	Mar-Nov
MHT	KMHT	Manchester–Boston Regional Airport	Manchester, New Hampshire, United States	UTC−05:00	Mar-Nov
MHU	YHOT	Mount Hotham Airport	Mount Hotham, Victoria, Australia	UTC+10:00	Oct-Apr
MHV	KMHV	Mojave Air and Space Port	Mojave, California, United States	UTC−08:00	Mar-Nov
MHW	SLAG	Monteagudo Airport	Monteagudo, Bolivia	UTC−04:00	
MHX	NCMH	Manihiki Island Airport	Manihiki, Cook Islands	UTC−10:00	
MHY		Morehead Airport	Morehead, Papua New Guinea	UTC+10:00	
MHZ	EGUN	RAF Mildenhall	Mildenhall, England, United Kingdom	UTC±00:00	Mar-Oct
-MI-
MIA	KMIA	Miami International Airport	Miami, Florida, United States	UTC−05:00	Mar-Nov
MIB	KMIB	Minot Air Force Base	Minot, North Dakota, United States	UTC−06:00	Mar-Nov
MIC	KMIC	Crystal Airport	Minneapolis / St Paul, Minnesota, United States	UTC−06:00	Mar-Nov
MID	MMMD	Manuel Crescencio Rejón International Airport	Mérida, Yucatán, Mexico	UTC−06:00	Apr-Oct
MIE	KMIE	Delaware County Regional Airport	Muncie, Indiana, United States	UTC−05:00	Mar-Nov
MIF		Roy Hurd Memorial Airport (FAA: E01)	Monahans, Texas, United States	UTC−06:00	Mar-Nov
MIG	ZUMY	Mianyang Nanjiao Airport	Mianyang, Sichuan, China	UTC+08:00	
MIH	YMIP	Mitchell Plateau Airport	Mitchell Plateau, Western Australia, Australia	UTC+08:00	
MII	SBML	Frank Miloye Milenkowichi–Marília State Airport	Marília, São Paulo, Brazil	UTC−03:00	
MIJ	MLIP	Mili Airport (FAA: 1Q9)	Mili Atoll, Marshall Islands	UTC+12:00	
MIK	EFMI	Mikkeli Airport	Mikkeli, Finland	UTC+02:00	Mar-Oct
MIL		metropolitan area^{1}	Milan, Lombardy, Italy	UTC+01:00	Mar-Oct
MIM	YMER	Merimbula Airport	Merimbula, New South Wales, Australia	UTC+10:00	Oct-Apr
MIN	YMPA	Minnipa Airport	Minnipa, South Australia, Australia	UTC+09:30	Oct-Apr
MIO	KMIO	Miami Municipal Airport	Miami, Oklahoma, United States	UTC−06:00	Mar-Nov
MIP	LLMR	Mitzpe Ramon Airport	Mitzpe Ramon, Israel	UTC+02:00	Mar-Oct
MIQ	KMLE	Millard Airport (FAA: MLE)	Omaha, Nebraska, United States	UTC−06:00	Mar-Nov
MIR	DTMB	Monastir Habib Bourguiba International Airport	Monastir, Tunisia	UTC+01:00	
MIS	AYMS	Misima Island Airport	Misima Island, Papua New Guinea	UTC+10:00	
MIT	KMIT	Shafter Airport (Minter Field)	Shafter, California, United States	UTC−08:00	Mar-Nov
MIU	DNMA	Maiduguri International Airport	Maiduguri, Nigeria	UTC+01:00	
MIV	KMIV	Millville Municipal Airport	Millville, New Jersey, United States	UTC−05:00	Mar-Nov
MIW	KMIW	Marshalltown Municipal Airport	Marshalltown, Iowa, United States	UTC−06:00	Mar-Nov
MIX		Mirití-Paraná Airport	Mirití-Paraná, Colombia	UTC−05:00	
MIY		Mittiebah Airport	Mittiebah Station, Northern Territory, Australia	UTC+09:30	
MIZ		Mainoru Airport	Mainoru, Northern Territory, Australia	UTC+09:30	
-MJ-
MJA	FMSJ	Manja Airport	Manja, Madagascar	UTC+03:00	
MJB		Mejit Airport (FAA: Q30)	Mejit Island, Marshall Islands	UTC+12:00	
MJC	DIMN	Man Airport	Man, Ivory Coast	UTC±00:00	
MJD	OPMJ	Moenjodaro Airport	Mohenjo-daro, Pakistan	UTC+05:00	
MJE		Majkin Airport	Majkin, Marshall Islands	UTC+12:00	
MJF	ENMS	Mosjøen Airport, Kjærstad	Mosjøen, Norway	UTC+01:00	Mar-Oct
MJI	HLLM	Mitiga International Airport	Tripoli, Libya	UTC+02:00	
MJJ		Moki Airport	Moki, Papua New Guinea	UTC+10:00	
MJK	YSHK	Shark Bay Airport	Monkey Mia, Western Australia, Australia	UTC+08:00	
MJL	FOGM	Mouila Airport	Mouila, Gabon	UTC+01:00	
MJM	FZWA	Mbuji Mayi Airport	Mbuji-Mayi, Democratic Republic of the Congo	UTC+02:00	
MJN	FMNM	Amborovy Airport (Philibert Tsiranana Airport)	Mahajanga, Madagascar	UTC+03:00	
MJO	FYME	Mount Etjo Airport	Mount Etjo, Namibia	UTC+01:00	Sep-Apr
MJP	YMJM	Manjimup Airport	Manjimup, Western Australia, Australia	UTC+08:00	
MJQ	KMJQ	Jackson Municipal Airport	Jackson, Minnesota, United States	UTC−06:00	Mar-Nov
MJR		Miramar Airport	Miramar, Buenos Aires, Argentina	UTC−03:00	
MJS		Maganja da Costa Airport	Maganja da Costa, Mozambique	UTC+02:00	
MJT	LGMT	Mytilene International Airport	Mytilene, Lesbos, Greece	UTC+02:00	Mar-Oct
MJU	WAAJ	Tampa Padang Airport	Mamuju, Indonesia	UTC+08:00	
MJV	LELC	Murcia–San Javier Airport	Murcia, Region of Murcia, Spain	UTC+01:00	Mar-Oct
MJW	FVMH	Mahenye Airport	Mahenye, Zimbabwe	UTC+02:00	
MJX	KMJX	Robert J. Miller Air Park (Ocean County Airport)	Toms River, New Jersey, United States	UTC−05:00	Mar-Nov
MJZ	UERR	Mirny Airport	Mirny, Yakutia, Russia	UTC+09:00	
-MK-
MKA	LKMR	Mariánské Lázně Airport	Mariánské Lázně, Czech Republic	UTC+01:00	Mar-Oct
MKB	FOOE	Mékambo Airport	Mékambo, Gabon	UTC+01:00	
MKC	KMKC	Charles B. Wheeler Downtown Airport	Kansas City, Missouri, United States	UTC−06:00	Mar-Nov
MKE	KMKE	Milwaukee Mitchell International Airport	Milwaukee, Wisconsin, United States	UTC−06:00	Mar-Nov
MKG	KMKG	Muskegon County Airport	Muskegon, Michigan, United States	UTC−05:00	Mar-Nov
MKH	FXMK	Mokhotlong Airport	Mokhotlong, Lesotho	UTC+02:00	
MKI	FEGE	M'Boki Airport	Obo, Central African Republic	UTC+01:00	
MKJ	FCOM	Makoua Airport	Makoua, Republic of the Congo	UTC+01:00	
MKK	PHMK	Molokai Airport	Kaunakakai, Hawaii, United States	UTC−10:00	
MKL	KMKL	McKellar–Sipes Regional Airport	Jackson, Tennessee, United States	UTC−06:00	Mar-Nov
MKM	WBGK	Mukah Airport	Mukah, Sarawak, Malaysia	UTC+08:00	
MKN		Malekolon Airport	Malekolon, Papua New Guinea	UTC+10:00	
MKO	KMKO	Davis Field	Muskogee, Oklahoma, United States	UTC−06:00	Mar-Nov
MKP	NTGM	Makemo Airport	Makemo, French Polynesia	UTC−10:00	
MKQ	WAKK	Mopah Airport	Merauke, Indonesia	UTC+09:00	
MKR	YMEK	Meekatharra Airport	Meekatharra, Western Australia, Australia	UTC+08:00	
MKS	HAMA	Mekane Selam Airport	Mekane Selam, Ethiopia	UTC+03:00	
MKT	KMKT	Mankato Regional Airport	Mankato, Minnesota, United States	UTC−06:00	Mar-Nov
MKU	FOOK	Makokou Airport	Makokou, Gabon	UTC+01:00	
MKV	YMVG	Mount Cavenagh Airport	Mount Cavenagh, Northern Territory, Australia	UTC+09:30	
MKW	WASR	Rendani Airport	Manokwari, Indonesia	UTC+09:00	
MKY	YBMK	Mackay Airport	Mackay, Queensland, Australia	UTC+10:00	
MKZ	WMKM	Malacca International Airport	Malacca City, Malacca, Malaysia	UTC+08:00	
-ML-
MLA	LMML	Malta International Airport (Luqa Airport)	Luqa, Malta	UTC+01:00	Mar-Oct
MLB	KMLB	Melbourne Orlando International Airport	Melbourne, Florida, United States	UTC−05:00	Mar-Nov
MLC	KMLC	McAlester Regional Airport	McAlester, Oklahoma, United States	UTC−06:00	Mar-Nov
MLD	KMLD	Malad City Airport	Malad City, Idaho, United States	UTC−07:00	Mar-Nov
MLE	VRMM	Ibrahim Nasir International Airport	Malé, Maldives	UTC+05:00	
MLF	KMLF	Milford Municipal Airport (Ben and Judy Briscoe Field)	Milford, Utah, United States	UTC−07:00	Mar-Nov
MLG	WARA	Abdul Rachman Saleh Airport	Malang, Indonesia	UTC+07:00	
MLH	LFSB	EuroAirport Basel Mulhouse Freiburg	Mulhouse, Alsace, France	UTC+01:00	Mar-Oct
MLI	KMLI	Quad Cities International Airport	Moline, Illinois, United States	UTC−06:00	Mar-Nov
MLJ	KMLJ	Baldwin County Airport	Milledgeville, Georgia, United States	UTC−05:00	Mar-Nov
MLK		Malta Airport (FAA: M75)	Malta, Montana, United States	UTC−07:00	Mar-Nov
MLL	PADM	Marshall Don Hunter Sr. Airport (FAA: MDM)	Marshall, Alaska, United States	UTC−09:00	Mar-Nov
MLM	MMMM	General Francisco J. Mujica International Airport	Morelia, Michoacán, Mexico	UTC−06:00	Apr-Oct
MLN	GEML	Melilla Airport	Melilla, Spain	UTC+01:00	Mar-Oct
MLO	LGML	Milos Island National Airport	Milos, Greece	UTC+02:00	Mar-Oct
MLP	RPMM	Malabang Airport	Malabang, Philippines	UTC+08:00	
MLQ		Malalaua Airport	Malalaua, Papua New Guinea	UTC+10:00	
MLR	YMCT	Millicent Airport	Millicent, South Australia, Australia	UTC+09:30	Oct-Apr
MLS	KMLS	Miles City Airport (Frank Wiley Field)	Miles City, Montana, United States	UTC−07:00	Mar-Nov
MLT	KMLT	Millinocket Municipal Airport	Millinocket, Maine, United States	UTC−05:00	Mar-Nov
MLU	KMLU	Monroe Regional Airport	Monroe, Louisiana, United States	UTC−06:00	Mar-Nov
MLV	YMEU	Merluna Airport	Merluna, Queensland, Australia	UTC+10:00	
MLW	GLMR	Spriggs Payne Airport	Monrovia, Liberia	UTC±00:00	
MLX	LTAT	Malatya Erhaç Airport	Malatya, Turkey	UTC+03:00	
MLY	PAML	Manley Hot Springs Airport	Manley Hot Springs, Alaska, United States	UTC−09:00	Mar-Nov
MLZ	SUMO	Cerro Largo International Airport	Melo, Uruguay	UTC−03:00	
-MM-
MMA		metropolitan area^{2}	Malmö, Sweden	UTC+01:00	Mar-Oct
MMB	RJCM	Memanbetsu Airport	Ōzora, Hokkaido, Japan	UTC+09:00	
MMC	MMDM	Ciudad Mante National Airport	Ciudad Mante, Tamaulipas, Mexico	UTC−06:00	Apr-Oct
MMD	ROMD	Minami-Daito Airport	Minamidaitō, Daitō Islands, Japan	UTC+09:00	
MME	EGNV	Teesside International Airport	Teesside, England, United Kingdom	UTC±00:00	Mar-Oct
MMF	FKKF	Mamfe Airport	Mamfe, Cameroon	UTC+01:00	
MMG	YMOG	Mount Magnet Airport	Mount Magnet, Western Australia, Australia	UTC+08:00	
MMH	KMMH	Mammoth Yosemite Airport	Mammoth Lakes, California, United States	UTC−08:00	Mar-Nov
MMI	KMMI	McMinn County Airport	Athens, Tennessee, United States	UTC−05:00	Mar-Nov
MMJ	RJAF	Matsumoto Airport	Matsumoto, Honshu, Japan	UTC+09:00	
MMK	ULMM	Murmansk Airport	Murmansk, Murmansk Oblast, Russia	UTC+03:00	
MML	KMML	Southwest Minnesota Regional Airport (Marshall/Ryan Field)	Marshall, Minnesota, United States	UTC−06:00	Mar-Nov
MMM	YMMU	Middlemount Airport	Middlemount, Queensland, Australia	UTC+10:00	
MMN		Minute Man Air Field (FAA: 6B6)	Stow, Massachusetts, United States	UTC−05:00	Mar-Nov
MMO	GVMA	Maio Airport	Maio Island, Cape Verde	UTC−01:00	
MMP	SKMP	San Bernardo Airport	Mompós (Mompóx), Colombia	UTC−05:00	
MMQ	FLBA	Mbala Airport	Mbala, Zambia	UTC+02:00	
MMS	KMMS	Selfs Airport	Marks, Mississippi, United States	UTC−06:00	Mar-Nov
MMT	KMMT	McEntire Joint National Guard Base	Columbia, South Carolina, United States	UTC−05:00	Mar-Nov
MMU	KMMU	Morristown Municipal Airport	Morristown, New Jersey, United States	UTC−05:00	Mar-Nov
MMV		Mal Island Airport	Mal Island, Papua New Guinea	UTC+10:00	
MMW		Moma Airport	Moma, Mozambique	UTC+02:00	
MMX	ESMS	Malmö Airport	Malmö, Sweden	UTC+01:00	Mar-Oct
MMY	ROMY	Miyako Airport	Miyakojima, Miyako Islands, Japan	UTC+09:00	
MMZ	OAMN	Maymana Airport	Maymana, Afghanistan	UTC+04:30	
-MN-
MNA	WAMN	Melangguane Airport	Melonguane, Indonesia	UTC+08:00	
MNB	FZAG	Muanda Airport (Moanda Airport)	Moanda, Democratic Republic of the Congo	UTC+01:00	
MNC	FQNC	Nacala Airport	Nacala, Mozambique	UTC+02:00	
MND		Medina Airport	Medina, Colombia	UTC−05:00	
MNE	YMUG	Mungeranie Airport	Mungeranie, South Australia, Australia	UTC+09:30	Oct-Apr
MNF	NFMA	Mana Island Airport	Mana Island, Fiji	UTC+12:00	Nov-Jan
MNG	YMGD	Maningrida Airport	Maningrida, Northern Territory, Australia	UTC+09:30	
MNH		Al-Musannah Airport	Al-Musannah, Oman	UTC+04:00	
MNI	TRPG	John A. Osborne Airport	British Overseas Territory of Montserrat	UTC−04:00	
MNJ	FMSM	Mananjary Airport	Mananjary, Madagascar	UTC+03:00	
MNK	NGMA	Maiana Airport	Maiana, Kiribati	UTC+12:00	
MNL	RPLL	Ninoy Aquino International Airport / Villamor Air Base	Manila, Philippines	UTC+08:00	
MNM	KMNM	Menominee-Marinette Twin County Airport	Menominee, Michigan, United States	UTC−06:00	Mar-Nov
MNN	KMNN	Marion Municipal Airport	Marion, Ohio, United States	UTC−05:00	Mar-Nov
MNO	FZRA	Manono Airport	Manono, Democratic Republic of the Congo	UTC+02:00	
MNP		Maron Island Airport	Maron Island, Papua New Guinea	UTC+10:00	
MNQ	YMTO	Monto Airport	Monto, Queensland, Australia	UTC+10:00	
MNR	FLMG	Mongu Airport	Mongu, Zambia	UTC+02:00	
MNS	FLMA	Mansa Airport	Mansa, Zambia	UTC+02:00	
MNT		Minto Al Wright Airport (FAA: 51Z)	Minto, Alaska, United States	UTC−09:00	Mar-Nov
MNU	VYMM	Mawlamyaing Airport	Mawlamyine (Mawlamyaing), Myanmar	UTC+06:30	
MNV		Mount Valley Airport	Mount Valley, Northern Territory, Australia	UTC+09:30	
MNW	YMDS	MacDonald Downs Airport	MacDonald Downs, Northern Territory, Australia	UTC+09:30	
MNX	SBMY	Manicoré Airport	Manicoré, Amazonas, Brazil	UTC−04:00	
MNY	AGGO	Mono Airport	Mono Island, Treasury Islands, Solomon Islands	UTC+11:00	
MNZ	KHEF	Manassas Regional Airport (FAA: HEF)	Manassas, Virginia, United States	UTC−05:00	Mar-Nov
-MO-
MOA	MUMO	Orestes Acosta Airport	Moa, Cuba	UTC−05:00	Mar-Nov
MOB	KMOB	Mobile Regional Airport	Mobile, Alabama, United States	UTC−06:00	Mar-Nov
MOC	SBMK	Montes Claros/Mário Ribeiro Airport	Montes Claros, Minas Gerais, Brazil	UTC−03:00	
MOD	KMOD	Modesto City–County Airport (Harry Sham Field)	Modesto, California, United States	UTC−08:00	Mar-Nov
MOE	VYMO	Momeik Airport	Momeik, Myanmar	UTC+06:30	
MOF	WATC	Frans Seda Airport (Wai Oti Airport)	Maumere, Indonesia	UTC+08:00	
MOG	VYMS	Monghsat Airport	Mong Hsat (Monghsat), Myanmar	UTC+06:30	
MOH		Maleo Airport	Morowali, Indonesia	UTC+08:00	
MOI	NCMR	Mitiaro Airport (Nukuroa Airport)	Mitiaro Island, Cook Islands	UTC−10:00	
MOJ	MEMO	Moengo Airstrip	Moengo, Suriname	UTC−03:00	
MOK	UNTM	Muynak Airport	Muynak, Uzbekistan	UTC+05:00	
MOL	ENML	Molde Airport, Årø	Molde, Norway	UTC+01:00	Mar-Oct
MOM	GQNL	Letfotar Airport	Moudjeria, Mauritania	UTC±00:00	
MON	NZMC	Mount Cook Aerodrome	Mount Cook, New Zealand	UTC+12:00	Sep-Apr
MOO	YOOM	Moomba Airport	Moomba, South Australia, Australia	UTC+09:30	Oct-Apr
MOP	KMOP	Mount Pleasant Municipal Airport	Mount Pleasant, Michigan, United States	UTC−05:00	Mar-Nov
MOQ	FMMV	Morondava Airport	Morondava, Madagascar	UTC+03:00	
MOR	KMOR	Morristown Regional Airport (Moore–Murrell Airport)	Morristown, Tennessee, United States	UTC−05:00	Mar-Nov
MOS		Moses Point Airport	Elim, Alaska, United States	UTC−09:00	Mar-Nov
MOT	KMOT	Minot International Airport	Minot, North Dakota, United States	UTC−06:00	Mar-Nov
MOU	PAMO	Mountain Village Airport	Mountain Village, Alaska, United States	UTC−09:00	Mar-Nov
MOV	YMRB	Moranbah Airport	Moranbah, Queensland, Australia	UTC+10:00	
MOW		metropolitan area^{3}	Moscow, Russia	UTC+03:00	
MOX	KMOX	Morris Municipal Airport	Morris, Minnesota, United States	UTC−06:00	Mar-Nov
MOY		Monterrey Airport	Monterrey, Colombia	UTC−05:00	
MOZ	NTTM	Moorea Airport (Temae Airport)	Mo'orea, Windward Islands, French Polynesia	UTC−10:00	
-MP-
MPA	FYKM	Katima Mulilo Airport (Mpacha Airport)	Katima Mulilo, Namibia	UTC+01:00	Sep-Apr
MPB		Miami Seaplane Base (FAA: X44)	Miami, Florida, United States	UTC−05:00	Mar-Nov
MPC	WIPU	Mukomuko Airport	Muko-Muko, Indonesia	UTC+07:00	
MPD	OPMP	Sindhri Airport	Mirpur Khas, Pakistan	UTC+05:00	
MPF		Mapoda Airport	Mapoda, Papua New Guinea	UTC+10:00	
MPG		Makini Airport	Makini, Papua New Guinea	UTC+10:00	
MPH	RPVE	Godofredo P. Ramos Airport (Caticlan Airport)	Malay, Philippines	UTC+08:00	
MPI		Mamitupu Airport	Mamitupo, Panama	UTC−05:00	
MPJ	KMPJ	Petit Jean Park Airport	Morrilton, Arkansas, United States	UTC−06:00	Mar-Nov
MPL	LFMT	Montpellier–Méditerranée Airport (Fréjorgues Airport)	Montpellier, Languedoc-Roussillon, France	UTC+01:00	Mar-Oct
MPM	FQMA	Maputo International Airport	Maputo, Mozambique	UTC+02:00	
MPN	EGYP	RAF Mount Pleasant	British Overseas Territory of Falkland Islands	UTC−03:00	
MPO	KMPO	Pocono Mountains Municipal Airport	Mount Pocono, Pennsylvania, United States	UTC−05:00	Mar-Nov
MPP		Mulatupo Airport	Mulatupo, Panama	UTC−05:00	
MPQ	OJMN	Ma'an Airport	Ma'an, Jordan	UTC+02:00	Mar-Oct
MPR	KMPR	McPherson Airport	McPherson, Kansas, United States	UTC−06:00	Mar-Nov
MPS	KOSA	Mount Pleasant Regional Airport (FAA: OSA)	Mount Pleasant, Texas, United States	UTC−06:00	Mar-Nov
MPT	WPMN	Maliana Airport	Maliana, East Timor	UTC+09:00	
MPU		Mabua Airstrip	Mabua, Papua New Guinea	UTC+10:00	
MPV	KMPV	Edward F. Knapp State Airport	Barre / Montpelier, Vermont, United States	UTC−05:00	Mar-Nov
MPW	UKCM	Mariupol International Airport	Mariupol, Ukraine	UTC+03:00	
MPX		Miyanmin Airport	Miyanmin, Papua New Guinea	UTC+10:00	
MPY	SOOA	Maripasoula Airport	Maripasoula, French Guiana	UTC−03:00	
MPZ	KMPZ	Mount Pleasant Municipal Airport	Mount Pleasant, Iowa, United States	UTC−06:00	Mar-Nov
-MQ-
MQA	YMDI	Mandora Station Airport	Mandora Station, Western Australia, Australia	UTC+08:00	
MQB	KMQB	Macomb Municipal Airport	Macomb, Illinois, United States	UTC−06:00	Mar-Nov
MQC	LFVM	Miquelon Airport	Miquelon, Saint Pierre and Miquelon	UTC−03:00	Mar-Nov
MQD	SAVQ	Maquinchao Airport	Maquinchao, Río Negro, Argentina	UTC−03:00	
MQE	YMQA	Marqua Airport	Marqua, Northern Territory, Australia	UTC+09:30	
MQF	USCM	Magnitogorsk International Airport	Magnitogorsk, Chelyabinsk Oblast^{5}, Russia	UTC+05:00	
MQG	FYMG	Midgard Airport	Midgard, Namibia	UTC+01:00	Sep-Apr
MQH	SBMC	Minaçu Airport	Minaçu, Goiás, Brazil	UTC−03:00	
MQJ	UEMA	Moma Airport	Khonuu, Yakutia, Russia	UTC+11:00	
MQK	SLTI	San Matías Airport	San Matías, Bolivia	UTC−04:00	
MQL	YMIA	Mildura Airport	Mildura, Victoria, Australia	UTC+10:00	Oct-Apr
MQM	LTCR	Mardin Airport	Mardin, Turkey	UTC+03:00	
MQN	ENRA	Mo i Rana Airport, Røssvoll	Mo i Rana, Norway	UTC+01:00	Mar-Oct
MQO		Malam Airport	Malam, Papua New Guinea	UTC+10:00	
MQP	FAKN	Kruger Mpumalanga International Airport	Mbombela, South Africa	UTC+02:00	
MQQ	FTTD	Moundou Airport	Moundou, Chad	UTC+01:00	
MQR		Mosquera Airport	Mosquera, Colombia	UTC−05:00	
MQS	TVSM	Mustique Airport	Mustique Island, Saint Vincent and the Grenadines	UTC−04:00	
MQT	KSAW	Sawyer International Airport (FAA: SAW)	Marquette, Michigan, United States	UTC−05:00	Mar-Nov
MQU	SKQU	Mariquita Airport	Mariquita, Colombia	UTC−05:00	
MQV		Mostaganem Airport	Mostaganem, Algeria	UTC+01:00	
MQW	KMQW	Telfair–Wheeler Airport	McRae, Georgia, United States	UTC−05:00	Mar-Nov
MQX	HAMK	Alula Aba Nega Airport	Mek'ele (Mekelle), Ethiopia	UTC+03:00	
MQY	KMQY	Smyrna Airport	Smyrna, Tennessee, United States	UTC−06:00	Mar-Nov
MQZ	YMGT	Margaret River Airport	Margaret River, Western Australia, Australia	UTC+08:00	
-MR-
MRA		Misrata Airport	Misrata, Libya	UTC+02:00	
MRB	KMRB	Eastern WV Regional Airport (Shepherd Field)	Martinsburg, West Virginia, United States	UTC−05:00	Mar-Nov
MRC	KMRC	Maury County Airport	Columbia/Mount Pleasant, Tennessee, United States	UTC−06:00	Mar-Nov
MRD	SVMD	Alberto Carnevalli Airport	Mérida, Venezuela	UTC−04:00	
MRE		Mara Serena Airport	Maasai Mara, Kenya	UTC+03:00	
MRF	KMRF	Marfa Municipal Airport	Marfa, Texas, United States	UTC−06:00	Mar-Nov
MRG	YMBA	Mareeba Airfield	Mareeba, Queensland, Australia	UTC+10:00	
MRH		May River Airport	May River, Papua New Guinea	UTC+10:00	
MRI	PAMR	Merrill Field	Anchorage, Alaska, United States	UTC−09:00	Mar-Nov
MRJ	MHMA	Marcala Airport	Marcala, Honduras	UTC−06:00	
MRK	KMKY	Marco Island Airport (FAA: MKY)	Marco Island, Florida, United States	UTC−05:00	Mar-Nov
MRL		Miners Lake Airport	Miners Lake, Queensland, Australia	UTC+10:00	
MRM	AYMA	Manari Airport	Manari, Papua New Guinea	UTC+10:00	
MRN	KMRN	Foothills Regional Airport (was Morganton-Lenoir Airport)	Morganton, North Carolina, United States	UTC−05:00	Mar-Nov
MRO	NZMS	Hood Aerodrome	Masterton, New Zealand	UTC+12:00	Sep-Apr
MRP	YALA	Marla Airport	Marla, South Australia, Australia	UTC+09:30	Oct-Apr
MRQ	RPUW	Marinduque Airport	Marinduque Island, Philippines	UTC+08:00	
MRR	SEMA	José María Velasco Ibarra Airport	Macará, Ecuador	UTC−05:00	
MRS	LFML	Marseille Provence Airport	Marseille, Provence-Alpes-Côte d'Azur, France	UTC+01:00	Mar-Oct
MRT		Moroak Airport	Moroak, Northern Territory, Australia	UTC+09:30	
MRU	FIMP	Sir Seewoosagur Ramgoolam International Airport	Plaine Magnien, Mauritius	UTC+04:00	
MRV	URMM	Mineralnye Vody Airport	Mineralnye Vody, Stavropol Krai, Russia	UTC+03:00	
MRW	EKMB	Lolland Falster Airport	Maribo, Denmark	UTC+01:00	Mar-Oct
MRX	OIAM	Mahshahr Airport	Bandar-e Mahshahr, Iran	UTC+03:30	Mar-Sep
MRY	KMRY	Monterey Regional Airport	Monterey, California, United States	UTC−08:00	Mar-Nov
MRZ	YMOR	Moree Airport	Moree, New South Wales, Australia	UTC+10:00	Oct-Apr
-MS-
MSA	CZMD	Muskrat Dam Airport	Muskrat Dam, Ontario, Canada	UTC−06:00	Mar-Nov
MSC	KFFZ	Falcon Field Airport (FAA: FFZ)	Phoenix, Arizona, United States	UTC−07:00	
MSD		Mount Pleasant Airport (FAA: 43U)	Mount Pleasant, Utah, United States	UTC−07:00	Mar-Nov
MSE	EGMH	Manston Airport (Kent International Airport)	Manston, England, United Kingdom	UTC±00:00	Mar-Oct
MSF	YMNS	Mount Swan Airport	Mount Swan, Northern Territory, Australia	UTC+09:30	
MSG	FXMA	Matsaile Airport	Matsaile, Lesotho	UTC+02:00	
MSH	OOMA	Masirah Air Base	Masirah Island, Oman	UTC+04:00	
MSI		Masalembo Airport	Masalembo, Indonesia	UTC+07:00	
MSJ	RJSM	Misawa Airport	Misawa, Honshu, Japan	UTC+09:00	
MSL	KMSL	Northwest Alabama Regional Airport	Muscle Shoals / Florence, Alabama, United States	UTC−06:00	Mar-Nov
MSM	FZCV	Masi-Manimba Airport	Masi-Manimba, Democratic Republic of the Congo	UTC+01:00	
MSN	KMSN	Dane County Regional Airport (Truax Field)	Madison, Wisconsin, United States	UTC−06:00	Mar-Nov
MSO	KMSO	Missoula International Airport	Missoula, Montana, United States	UTC−07:00	Mar-Nov
MSP	KMSP	Minneapolis–Saint Paul International Airport (Wold–Chamberlain Field)	Minneapolis / St Paul, Minnesota, United States	UTC−06:00	Mar-Nov
MSQ	UMMS	Minsk National Airport	Minsk, Belarus	UTC+03:00	
MSR	LTCK	Muş Airport	Muş, Turkey	UTC+03:00	
MSS	KMSS	Massena International Airport (Richards Field)	Massena, New York, United States	UTC−05:00	Mar-Nov
MST	EHBK	Maastricht Aachen Airport	Maastricht, Netherlands	UTC+01:00	Mar-Oct
MSU	FXMM	Moshoeshoe I International Airport	Maseru, Lesotho	UTC+02:00	
MSV	KMSV	Sullivan County International Airport	Monticello, New York, United States	UTC−05:00	Mar-Nov
MSW	HHMS	Massawa International Airport	Massawa, Eritrea	UTC+03:00	
MSX	FCMM	Mossendjo Airport	Mossendjo, Republic of the Congo	UTC+01:00	
MSY	KMSY	Louis Armstrong New Orleans International Airport	New Orleans, Louisiana, United States	UTC−06:00	Mar-Nov
MSZ	FNMO	Moçâmedes Airport (Yuri Gagarin Airport)	Moçâmedes, Angola	UTC+01:00	
-MT-
MTA	NZMA	Matamata Airport	Matamata, New Zealand	UTC+12:00	Sep-Apr
MTB	SKML	Montelíbano Airport	Montelíbano, Colombia	UTC−05:00	
MTC	KMTC	Selfridge Air National Guard Base	Mount Clemens, Michigan, United States	UTC−05:00	Mar-Nov
MTD	YMSF	Mount Sandford Station Airport	Mount Sandford Station, Northern Territory, Australia	UTC+09:30	
MTE	SNMA	Monte Alegre Airport	Monte Alegre, Pará, Brazil	UTC−03:00	
MTF	HAMT	Mizan Teferi Airport	Mizan Teferi, Ethiopia	UTC+03:00	
MTG		Mato Grosso Airport	Mato Grosso, Brazil	UTC−04:00	
MTH	KMTH	Florida Keys Marathon Airport	Marathon, Florida, United States	UTC−05:00	Mar-Nov
MTI	GVMT	Mosteiros Airport	Mosteiros, Cape Verde	UTC−01:00	
MTJ	KMTJ	Montrose Regional Airport	Montrose, Colorado, United States	UTC−07:00	Mar-Nov
MTK	NGMN	Makin Airport	Makin Island (Butaritari), Kiribati	UTC+12:00	
MTL	YMND	Maitland Airport	Maitland, New South Wales, Australia	UTC+10:00	Oct-Apr
MTM	PAMM	Metlakatla Seaplane Base	Metlakatla, Alaska, United States	UTC−09:00	Mar-Nov
MTN	KMTN	Martin State Airport	Baltimore, Maryland, United States	UTC−05:00	Mar-Nov
MTO	KMTO	Coles County Memorial Airport	Mattoon / Charleston, Illinois, United States	UTC−06:00	Mar-Nov
MTP	KMTP	Montauk Airport	Montauk, New York, United States	UTC−05:00	Mar-Nov
MTQ	YMIT	Mitchell Airport	Mitchell, Queensland, Australia	UTC+10:00	
MTR	SKMR	Los Garzones Airport	Montería, Colombia	UTC−05:00	
MTS	FDMS	Matsapha Airport	Manzini, Eswatini	UTC+02:00	
MTT	MMMT	Minatitlán/Coatzacoalcos International Airport	Minatitlán, Veracruz, Mexico	UTC−06:00	Apr-Oct
MTU		Montepuez Airport	Montepuez, Mozambique	UTC+02:00	
MTV	NVSA	Mota Lava Airport	Mota Lava, Vanuatu	UTC+11:00	
MTW	KMTW	Manitowoc County Airport	Manitowoc, Wisconsin, United States	UTC−06:00	Mar-Nov
MTX	PABK	Metro Field (FAA: MTF)	Fairbanks, Alaska, United States	UTC−09:00	Mar-Nov
MTY	MMMY	General Mariano Escobedo International Airport	Monterrey, Nuevo León, Mexico	UTC−06:00	Apr-Oct
MTZ	LLMZ	Bar Yehuda Airfield (Masada Airfield)	Masada, Israel	UTC+02:00	Mar-Oct
-MU-
MUA	AGGM	Munda Airport	Munda, New Georgia, Solomon Islands	UTC+11:00	
MUB	FBMN	Maun Airport	Maun, Botswana	UTC+02:00	
MUC	EDDM	Munich Airport	Munich, Bavaria, Germany	UTC+01:00	Mar-Oct
MUD	FQMD	Mueda Airport	Mueda, Mozambique	UTC+02:00	
MUE	PHMU	Waimea-Kohala Airport	Kamuela, Hawaii, United States	UTC−10:00	
MUF		Muting Airport	Muting, Indonesia	UTC+09:00	
MUG	MMMG	Mulegé Airstrip	Mulegé, Baja California Sur, Mexico	UTC−07:00	Apr-Oct
MUH	HEMM	Marsa Matruh International Airport	Mersa Matruh, Egypt	UTC+02:00	
MUI	KMUI	Muir Army Airfield	Fort Indiantown Gap, Pennsylvania, United States	UTC−05:00	Mar-Nov
MUJ	HAMR	Mui Airport	Mui, Ethiopia	UTC+03:00	
MUK	NCMK	Mauke Airport	Mauke Island, Cook Islands	UTC−10:00	
MUL	KMUL	Spence Airport	Moultrie, Georgia, United States	UTC−05:00	Mar-Nov
MUN	SVMT	José Tadeo Monagas International Airport	Maturín, Venezuela	UTC−04:00	
MUO	KMUO	Mountain Home Air Force Base	Mountain Home, Idaho, United States	UTC−07:00	Mar-Nov
MUP	YMUP	Mulga Park Airport	Mulga Park, Northern Territory, Australia	UTC+09:30	
MUQ	YMUC	Muccan Station Airport	Muccan Station, Western Australia, Australia	UTC+08:00	
MUR	WBGM	Marudi Airport	Marudi, Sarawak, Malaysia	UTC+08:00	
MUS	RJAM	Minami Torishima Airport	Minami-Tori-shima, Japan	UTC+09:00	
MUT	KMUT	Muscatine Municipal Airport	Muscatine, Iowa, United States	UTC−06:00	Mar-Nov
MUW	DAOV	Ghriss Airport	Ghriss, Algeria	UTC+01:00	
MUX	OPMT	Multan International Airport	Multan, Pakistan	UTC+05:00	
MUY	FCBM	Mouyondzi Airport	Mouyondzi, Republic of the Congo	UTC+01:00	
MUZ	HTMU	Musoma Airport	Musoma, Tanzania	UTC+03:00	
-MV-
MVA	BIRL	Mývatn Airport	Mývatn, Iceland	UTC±00:00	
MVB	FOON	M'Vengue El Hadj Omar Bongo Ondimba International Airport	Franceville, Gabon	UTC+01:00	
MVC	KMVC	Monroe County Airport	Monroeville, Alabama, United States	UTC−06:00	Mar-Nov
MVD	SUMU	Carrasco Gral. Cesáreo L. Berisso International Airport	Montevideo, Uruguay	UTC−03:00	
MVE	KMVE	Montevideo–Chippewa County Airport	Montevideo, Minnesota, United States	UTC−06:00	Mar-Nov
MVF	SBMS	Gov. Dix-Sept Rosado Airport	Mossoró, Rio Grande do Norte, Brazil	UTC−03:00	
MVG		Mevang Airport	Mevang, Gabon	UTC+01:00	
MVH		Macksville Airport	Macksville, New South Wales, Australia	UTC+10:00	Oct-Apr
MVI		Manetai Airport	Manetai, Papua New Guinea	UTC+11:00	
MVK	YMUK	Mulka Airport	Mulka, South Australia, Australia	UTC+09:30	Oct-Apr
MVL	KMVL	Morrisville–Stowe State Airport	Morrisville / Stowe, Vermont, United States	UTC−05:00	Mar-Nov
MVM		Kayenta Airport (FAA: 0V7)	Kayenta, Arizona, United States	UTC−07:00	Mar-Nov
MVN	KMVN	Mount Vernon Airport	Mount Vernon, Illinois, United States	UTC−06:00	Mar-Nov
MVO	FTTM	Mongo Airport	Mongo, Chad	UTC+01:00	
MVP	SKMU	Fabio Alberto León Bentley Airport	Mitú, Colombia	UTC−05:00	
MVQ	UMOO	Mogilev Airport	Mogilev, Belarus	UTC+03:00	
MVR	FKKL	Salak Airport	Maroua, Cameroon	UTC+01:00	
MVS	SNMU	Mucuri Airport	Mucuri, Bahia, Brazil	UTC−03:00	
MVT	NTGV	Mataiva Airport	Mataiva, Tuamotus, French Polynesia	UTC−10:00	
MVU	YMGV	Musgrave Airport	Musgrave, Queensland, Australia	UTC+08:00	
MVV	LFHM	Megève Altiport	Megève, Rhône-Alpes, France	UTC+01:00	Mar-Oct
MVW	KBVS	Skagit Regional Airport (FAA: BVS)	Burlington / Mount Vernon, Washington, United States	UTC−08:00	Mar-Nov
MVX	FOGV	Minvoul Airport	Minvoul, Gabon	UTC+01:00	
MVY	KMVY	Martha's Vineyard Airport	Vineyard Haven, Massachusetts, United States	UTC−05:00	Mar-Nov
MVZ	FVMV	Masvingo Airport	Masvingo, Zimbabwe	UTC+02:00	
-MW-
MWA	KMWA	Williamson County Regional Airport	Marion, Illinois, United States	UTC−06:00	Mar-Nov
MWB	YMRW	Morawa Airport	Morawa, Western Australia, Australia	UTC+08:00	
MWC	KMWC	Lawrence J. Timmerman Airport	Milwaukee, Wisconsin, United States	UTC−06:00	Mar-Nov
MWD	OPMI	PAF Base M.M. Alam	Mianwali, Pakistan	UTC+05:00	
MWE	HSMR	Merowe Airport	Merowe, Sudan	UTC+03:00	
MWF	NVSN	Maewo-Naone Airport	Maewo, Vanuatu	UTC+11:00	
MWG		Marawaka Airport	Marawaka, Papua New Guinea	UTC+10:00	
MWH	KMWH	Grant County International Airport	Moses Lake, Washington, United States	UTC−08:00	Mar-Nov
MWI		Maramuni Airport	Maramuni, Papua New Guinea	UTC+10:00	
MWJ	SYMR	Matthews Ridge Airport	Matthew's Ridge, Guyana	UTC−04:00	
MWK	WIOM	Matak Airport (Tarempa Airport)	Matak, Indonesia	UTC+07:00	
MWL	KMWL	Mineral Wells Airport	Mineral Wells, Texas, United States	UTC−06:00	Mar-Nov
MWM	KMWM	Windom Municipal Airport	Windom, Minnesota, United States	UTC−06:00	Mar-Nov
MWN	HTMD	Mwadui Airport	Mwadui, Tanzania	UTC+03:00	
MWO	KMWO	Middletown Regional Airport (Hook Field)	Middletown, Ohio, United States	UTC−05:00	Mar-Nov
MWQ	VYMW	Magway Airport	Magway, Myanmar	UTC+06:30	
MWR		Motswari Airstrip	Motswari, South Africa	UTC+02:00	
MWS	WAMP	Morowali IMIP Airport	Morowali, Indonesia	UTC+08:00	
MWT	YMWT	Moolawatana Airport	Moolawatana Station, South Australia, Australia	UTC+09:30	Oct-Apr
MWU		Mussau Island Airport	Mussau Island, Papua New Guinea	UTC+10:00	
MWV	VDMK	Mondulkiri Airport	Senmonorom, Cambodia	UTC+07:00	
MWX	RKJB	Muan International Airport	Muan, South Korea	UTC+09:00	
MWY	YMIR	Miranda Downs Airport	Miranda Downs, Queensland, Australia	UTC+10:00	
MWZ	HTMW	Mwanza Airport	Mwanza, Tanzania	UTC+03:00	
-MX-
MXA	KMXA	Manila Municipal Airport	Manila, Arkansas, United States	UTC−06:00	Mar-Nov
MXB	WAWM	Andi Jemma Airport	Masamba, Indonesia	UTC+08:00	
MXC		Monticello Airport (FAA: U43)	Monticello, Utah, United States	UTC−07:00	Mar-Nov
MXD	YMWX	Marion Downs Airport	Marion Downs Station, Queensland, Australia	UTC+10:00	
MXE	KMEB	Laurinburg–Maxton Airport (FAA: MEB)	Laurinburg / Maxton, North Carolina, United States	UTC−05:00	Mar-Nov
MXF	KMXF	Maxwell Air Force Base	Montgomery, Alabama, United States	UTC−06:00	Mar-Nov
MXG		Marlboro Airport (FAA: 9B1)	Marlborough, Massachusetts, United States	UTC−05:00	Mar-Nov
MXH	AYMR	Moro Airport	Moro, Papua New Guinea	UTC+10:00	
MXI	RPMQ	Mati Airport (Imelda R. Marcos Airport)	Mati, Philippines	UTC+08:00	
MXJ	DNMN	Minna Airport	Minna, Nigeria	UTC+01:00	
MXK		Mindik Airport	Mindik, Papua New Guinea	UTC+10:00	
MXL	MMML	Mexicali International Airport	Mexicali, Baja California, Mexico	UTC−08:00	Mar-Nov
MXM	FMSR	Morombe Airport	Morombe, Madagascar	UTC+03:00	
MXN	LFRU	Morlaix – Ploujean Airport	Morlaix, Brittany, France	UTC+01:00	Mar-Oct
MXO	KMXO	Monticello Regional Airport	Monticello, Iowa, United States	UTC−06:00	Mar-Nov
MXP	LIMC	Milan–Malpensa Airport	Milan, Lombardy, Italy	UTC+01:00	Mar-Oct
MXR		Myrhorod Air Base	Myrhorod, Ukraine	UTC+02:00	Mar-Oct
MXS	NSMA	Maota Airport	Maota, Samoa	UTC+13:00	Sep-Apr
MXT	FMMO	Maintirano Airport	Maintirano, Madagascar	UTC+03:00	
MXU	YMWA	Mullewa Airport	Mullewa, Western Australia, Australia	UTC+08:00	
MXV	ZMMN	Mörön Airport	Mörön, Mongolia	UTC+08:00	
MXW	ZMMG	Mandalgovi Airport	Mandalgovi, Mongolia	UTC+08:00	
MXX	ESKM	Mora–Siljan Airport	Mora, Sweden	UTC+01:00	Mar-Oct
MXY	PAMX	McCarthy Airport (FAA: 15Z)	McCarthy, Alaska, United States	UTC−09:00	Mar-Nov
MXZ	ZGMX	Meixian Airport	Meizhou, Guangdong, China	UTC+08:00	
-MY-
MYA	YMRY	Moruya Airport	Moruya, New South Wales, Australia	UTC+10:00	Oct-Apr
MYB	FOOY	Mayumba Airport	Mayumba, Gabon	UTC+01:00	
MYC	SVBS	Mariscal Sucre Airport	Maracay, Venezuela	UTC−04:00	
MYD	HKML	Malindi Airport	Malindi, Kenya	UTC+03:00	
MYE	RJTQ	Miyakejima Airport	Miyake-jima, Japan	UTC+09:00	
MYF	KMYF	Montgomery Field Airport	San Diego, California, United States	UTC−08:00	Mar-Nov
MYG	MYMM	Mayaguana Airport (Abraham's Bay Airport)	Mayaguana, Bahamas	UTC−05:00	Mar-Nov
MYH		Marble Canyon Airport (FAA: L41)	Marble Canyon, Arizona, United States	UTC−07:00	
MYI	YMUI	Murray Island Airport	Murray Island, Queensland, Australia	UTC+10:00	
MYJ	RJOM	Matsuyama Airport	Matsuyama, Shikoku, Japan	UTC+09:00	
MYK		May Creek Airport	May Creek, Alaska, United States	UTC−09:00	Mar-Nov
MYL	KMYL	McCall Municipal Airport	McCall, Idaho, United States	UTC−07:00	Mar-Nov
MYM	SYMM	Monkey Mountain Airport	Monkey Mountain, Guyana	UTC−04:00	
MYN	OYMB	Marib Airport	Ma'rib, Yemen	UTC+03:00	
MYO	YMYR	Myroodah Airport	Myroodah Station, Western Australia, Australia	UTC+08:00	
MYP	UTAM	Mary International Airport	Mary, Turkmenistan	UTC+05:00	
MYQ	VOMY	Mysore Airport (Mandakalli Airport)	Mysore, Karnataka, India	UTC+05:30	
MYR	KMYR	Myrtle Beach International Airport	Myrtle Beach, South Carolina, United States	UTC−05:00	Mar-Nov
MYT	VYMK	Myitkyina Airport	Myitkyina, Myanmar	UTC+06:30	
MYU	PAMY	Mekoryuk Airport	Mekoryuk, Alaska, United States	UTC−09:00	Mar-Nov
MYV	KMYV	Yuba County Airport	Marysville, California, United States	UTC−08:00	Mar-Nov
MYW	HTMT	Mtwara Airport	Mtwara, Tanzania	UTC+03:00	
MYX		Menyamya Airport	Menyamya, Papua New Guinea	UTC+10:00	
MYY	WBGR	Miri Airport	Miri, Sarawak, Malaysia	UTC+08:00	
MYZ	FWMY	Monkey Bay Airport	Monkey Bay, Malawi	UTC+02:00	
-MZ-
MZA	SPMF	Manuel Prado Ugarteche Airport	Mazamari, Peru	UTC−05:00	
MZB	FQMP	Mocímboa da Praia Airport	Mocímboa da Praia, Mozambique	UTC+02:00	
MZC	FOOM	Mitzic Airport	Mitzic, Gabon	UTC+01:00	
MZD		Méndez Airport	Santiago de Méndez, Ecuador	UTC−05:00	
MZE	MZSL	Manatee Airport	Spanish Lookout, Belize	UTC−06:00	
MZF	FAMW	Wild Coast Sun Airport	Mzamba, South Africa	UTC+02:00	
MZG	RCQC	Magong Airport	Magong, Taiwan	UTC+08:00	
MZH	LTAP	Amasya Merzifon Airport	Amasya, Turkey	UTC+03:00	
MZI	GAMB	Mopti Airport (Ambodedjo Airport)	Mopti, Mali	UTC±00:00	
MZJ	KMZJ	Pinal Airpark	Marana, Arizona, United States	UTC−07:00	
MZK	NGMK	Marakei Airport	Marakei, Kiribati	UTC+12:00	
MZL	SKMZ	La Nubia Airport (Santaguida Airport)	Manizales, Colombia	UTC−05:00	
MZM	LFSF	Metz-Frescaty Air Base	Metz, Lorraine, France	UTC+01:00	Mar-Oct
MZN		Minj Airport	Minj, Papua New Guinea	UTC+10:00	
MZO	MUMZ	Sierra Maestra Airport	Manzanillo, Cuba	UTC−05:00	Mar-Nov
MZP	NZMK	Motueka Aerodrome	Motueka, New Zealand	UTC+12:00	Sep-Apr
MZQ	FAMU	Mkuze Airport	Mkuze, South Africa	UTC+02:00	
MZR	OAMS	Mazar-e Sharif International Airport	Mazar-i-Sharif, Afghanistan	UTC+04:30	
MZT	MMMZ	Mazatlán International Airport	Mazatlán, Sinaloa, Mexico	UTC−07:00	Apr-Oct
MZU	VEMZ	Muzaffarpur Airport	Muzaffarpur, Bihar, India	UTC+05:30	
MZV	WBMU	Mulu Airport	Mulu, Sarawak, Malaysia	UTC+08:00	
MZW	DAAY	Mécheria Airport	Mécheria, Algeria	UTC+01:00	
MZX	HAML	Mena Airport	Mena, Ethiopia	UTC+03:00	
MZY	FAMO	Mossel Bay Airport	Mossel Bay, South Africa	UTC+02:00	
MZZ	KMZZ	Marion Municipal Airport	Marion, Indiana, United States	UTC−05:00	Mar-Nov

== Notes ==
- ^1 MIL is common IATA code for Milan–Malpensa Airport (IATA: MXP), Linate Airport (IATA: LIN), Il Caravaggio International Airport (IATA: BGY) and Parma Airport (IATA: PMF).
- ^2 MMA covers Malmö Airport (IATA: MMX) only.
- ^3 MOW is common IATA code for Domodedovo International Airport (IATA: DME), Sheremetyevo International Airport (IATA: SVO) and Vnukovo International Airport (IATA: VKO).
- ^4 Morocco temporarily suspends DST for the month of Ramadan.
- ^5 Airport is located in neighboring Republic of Bashkortostan.
