= Mount Pleasant Airport =

Mount Pleasant Airport may refer to:

- Mount Pleasant Airport (Utah) in Mount Pleasant, Utah, United States (FAA: 43U)
- Mount Pleasant Regional Airport (South Carolina) in Mount Pleasant, South Carolina, United States (FAA: LRO)
- Mount Pleasant Regional Airport (Texas) in Mount Pleasant, Texas, United States (FAA: OSA)
- Mount Pleasant/Scottdale Airport in Mount Pleasant, Pennsylvania, United States (FAA: P45)
- RAF Mount Pleasant, a military base for the Royal Air Force in the British Overseas Territory of the Falkland Islands (IATA: MPN)
- RCAF Station Mount Pleasant, a Second World War British Commonwealth Air Training Plan (BCATP) station located at Mount Pleasant, Prince Edward Island, Canada

== See also ==
- Mount Pleasant Municipal Airport (disambiguation)
- Mount Pleasant Regional Airport (disambiguation)
