= Mount Pleasant Regional Airport =

Mount Pleasant Regional Airport may refer to:

- Mount Pleasant Regional Airport (South Carolina) in Mount Pleasant, South Carolina, United States (FAA: LRO)
- Mount Pleasant Regional Airport (Texas) in Mount Pleasant, Texas, United States (FAA: OSA)

== See also ==
- Mount Pleasant Airport (disambiguation)
- Mount Pleasant Municipal Airport (disambiguation)
