= MFY (disambiguation) =

MFY is Music for Youth, a British charity for young musicians.

MFY may also refer to:

- Mayo language, spoken in Mexico (by ISO 639 code)
- Mayfa'ah Airport, Yemen (by IATA code)
- Middle Footscray railway station, Melbourne
