= MVS (disambiguation) =

MVS is an IBM mainframe computer operating system, commonly known as Multiple Virtual Storage.

MVS may also refer to:

- Manufacture de Voitures de Sport, the original name of the Venturi car company
- Maritime Volunteer Service, a UK Charity supplying Maritime Training and Support
- Microsoft Visual Studio, an integrated development environment
- Marquez Valdes-Scantling, American football wide receiver
- Metal vapor synthesis, a technique in chemistry
- Mezinárodní všeodborový svaz, a Czechoslovak trade union federation
- Minimum Viable Service, the service equivalent of Minimum Viable Product (MVP)
- Ministry of Internal Affairs of Ukraine (abbr. MVS of Ministerstvo Vnutrishnikh Sprav from Ukrainian: Міністерство Внутрішніх Справ)
- Mobile Visual Search
- Mucuri Airport, in Buenos Aires (IATA code: MVS)
- MVS Comunicaciones, a Mexican media company
  - MVS Radio, a group of international Spanish-language radio networks
  - MVS TV, a Mexican cable television network
- Neo Geo MVS arcade game system from SNK
