= Mount Pleasant Municipal Airport =

Mount Pleasant Municipal Airport may refer to:

- Mount Pleasant Municipal Airport (Iowa) in Mount Pleasant, Iowa, United States (FAA: MPZ)
- Mount Pleasant Municipal Airport (Michigan) in Mount Pleasant, Michigan, United States (FAA: MOP)

== See also ==
- Mount Pleasant Airport (disambiguation)
- Mount Pleasant Regional Airport (disambiguation)
