= MXG =

MXG or mxg may refer to:

- Maxim Power, Toronto Stock Exchange symbol MXG
- MXG, the IATA code for Marlboro Airport, a defunct airport in Marlborough, Massachusetts
- mxg, the ISO 639-3 code for Mbangala language, Angola
