= MFO =

MFO may refer to:

== Organisations ==
- Maison Française d'Oxford, a French research institute based in Oxford, England
- Multinational Force and Observers, an international peacekeeping force; or the related medal
- Maschinenfabrik Oerlikon, a defunct Swiss manufacturing company, merged into Brown, Boveri & Cie in 1967
- Mathematisches Forschungsinstitut Oberwolfach (Mathematical Research Institute of Oberwolfach), in Germany
- MrFixitOnline, a prominent gaming site focusing on online games, notably Age of Empires II: The Age of Kings that specialized in expert strategy and high caliber tournaments, in operation from ~2000 - 2006.
- Multi-family office, organisations which protect and grow the wealth of several families by providing full growth and philanthropic investment advice.

== Entertainment ==
- MFÖ, a Turkish band
- My Family Online, a website/forum for hit BBC One sitcom, My Family

== Science ==
- In immunology, Multi Function Oxidase
- Mixed-function oxidase

== Other ==
- MFO, IATA airport code of Manguna Airport in Papua New Guinea
- Marine Fuel Oil
