= MFV (disambiguation) =

MFV is the IATA code for Accomack County Airport, Virginia, USA.

MFV may also refer to:

- Mandjak language, spoken in Africa (by ISO 639 code)
- Motorised Fishing Vessel
