= Middleton Island Air Force Station =

Former military installation in Alaska, United States

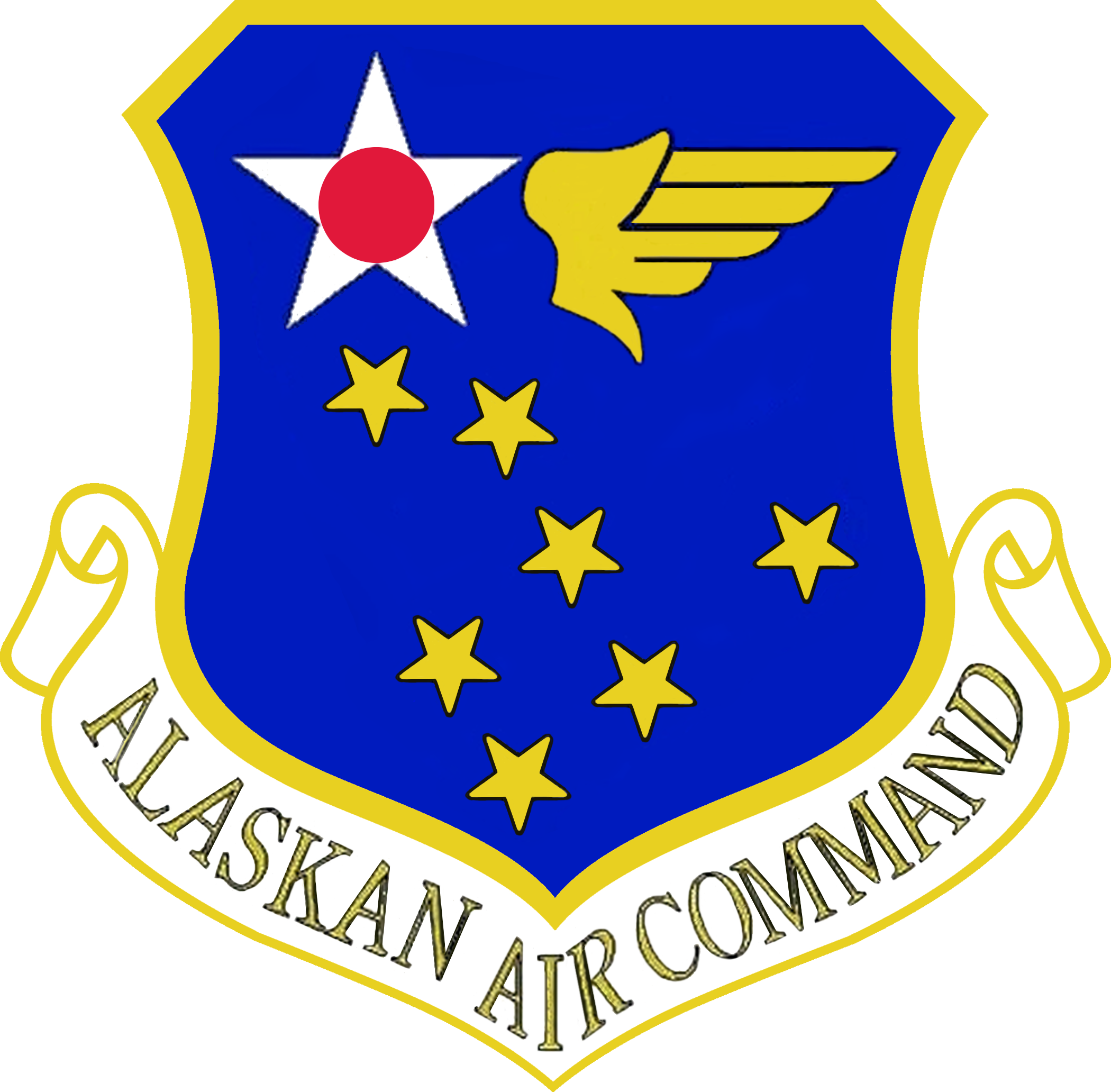
Middleton Island Air Force Station
- Part of Alaskan Air Command (AAC)
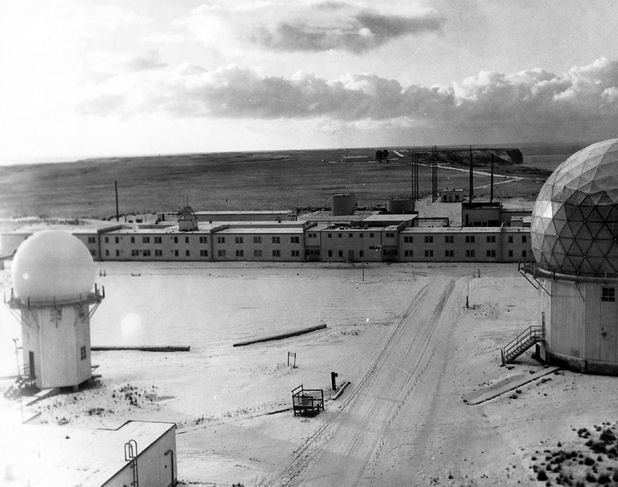
- Middleton Island Air Force Station

Site information
- Type: Air Force Station
- Controlled by: United States Air Force

Location
- Location of Middleton Island AFS, Alaska
- Coordinates: 59°27′12″N 146°19′07″W

Site history
- Built: 1958
- In use: 1958-1963

Garrison information
- Garrison: 720th Aircraft Control and Warning Squadron (1958-1963)

Middleton Island Air Force Station (AAC ID: F-22) is a closed United States Air Force General Surveillance Radar station. It was located on Middleton Island, in the Gulf of Alaska, 173 miles (278 km) south of Anchorage, Alaska. It operated for five years, from May 1958 to May 1963. Since the 1970s, it has been repurposed by the Middleton Island Marine Biological Station to study seabirds and other flora and fauna.

== History ==
Middleton Island AFS was a continental defense radar station whose mission was to provide the United States Air Force early warning of an attack by the Soviet Union. It was located on Middleton Island, an isolated island about 3 1/2 miles long and 1/2 mile wide in the Gulf of Alaska.

Plans were made for a permanent radar site beginning in late 1956. In 1957, the island was transferred from the jurisdiction of the Bureau of Land Management to the Department of Defense for construction. A dock facility allowed Naval LSTs and barges to land equipment and material on the island. An airstrip was built allowing cargo transports and personnel to fly in and out. The Alaskan Air Command, after investigating various options, constructed a White Alice Communications System, operated by the Air Force Communications Service (AFCS). The base was activated in 1958.

The 720th Aircraft Control and Warning Squadron was assigned to the station in May 1958 and operated AN/FPS-3, AN/FPS-6, AN/FPS-8, and AN/FPS-4 radars. As a surveillance station, its mission was to monitor the airspace for aircraft activity and provide information 24/7 to the air defense Direction Center at Fire Island AFS near Anchorage, where it was analyzed to determine range, direction, altitude, speed, and whether aircraft were friendly or hostile.

The normally frigid arctic cold of Alaska is moderated by the warmer Pacific Ocean. With the relative moderate climate on Middleton Island, the buildings were not all connected by hallways. The weather, however, was frequently heavy rain, snow and wind. As with all remote AC&W sites in Alaska, duty tours were limited to one year because of the psychological strain and physical hardships.

The station was expensive to maintain and was deactivated on 15 May 1963 due to budget reductions, and replaced by other AAC surveillance radar sites with more capable equipment. The base was sold to a consortium of private investors in 1966.

Today the site is privately owned; buildings, radar towers, and communications antennas are in deteriorated condition. Beginning in 1978, nine of the buildings have been repurposed by the Middleton Island Marine Biological Station to study cliff-dwelling seabirds, which roost in the buildings. In the 1990s, the station began building bird facilities in some of the towers, with glass windows allowing researchers inside to monitor nesting birds immediately outside, similar to pigeons nesting on a windowsill of a high-rise building, but purpose built with 100s of small windows all over the towers.

== Air Force units and assignments ==
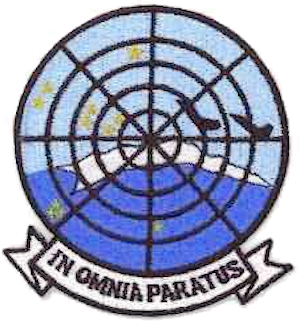
Emblem of the 720th Aircraft Control and Warning Squadron

Units:

- 720th Aircraft Control and Warning Squadron, Activated 8 September 1955

Inactivated 1 October 1963

Assignments:

- 10th Air Division, 8 September 1955
- 5039th Aircraft Control and Warning Group, 1 June 1957
- 5040th Aircraft Control and Warning Group, 1 November 1959
- 5070th Air Defense Wing, 1 August 1960 – 1 October 1969

== See also ==
- Alaskan Air Command
