= Eastern Shore Community College =

Public college in Melfa, Virginia, US

Coordinates: 37°38′25.9″N 75°45′2.3″W

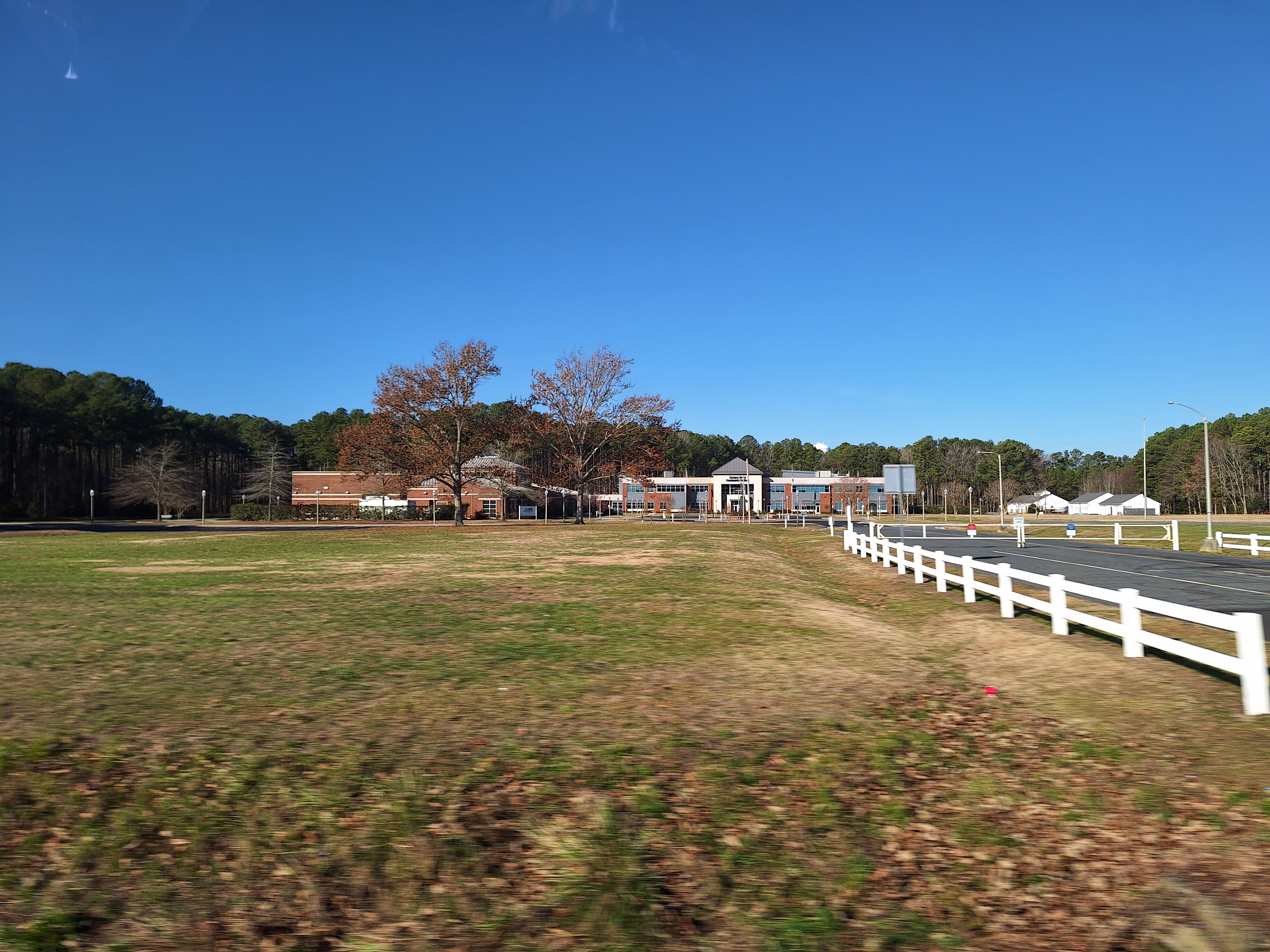
Eastern Shore Community College

Eastern Shore Community College is a community college in unincorporated Accomack County, Virginia, with a Melfa postal address. It is a member of the Virginia Community College System and serves the residents of Accomack County and Northampton County as a two-year institution of higher learning.

Operating under policies established by the State Board for Community Colleges and the Eastern Shore Community College Board, the college is financed primarily with state funds, supplemented by contributions from the two counties and the Eastern Shore Community College Foundation.

Eastern Shore Community College is accredited by the Commission on Colleges of the Southern Association of Colleges and Schools to award associate degrees. The college provides associate degree programs approved by the State Council of Higher Education for Virginia.

Eastern Shore Community College is a member of the American Association of Community Colleges and the Southern Association of Junior Colleges.
