= Anne Mbusu =

Congolese government administrator

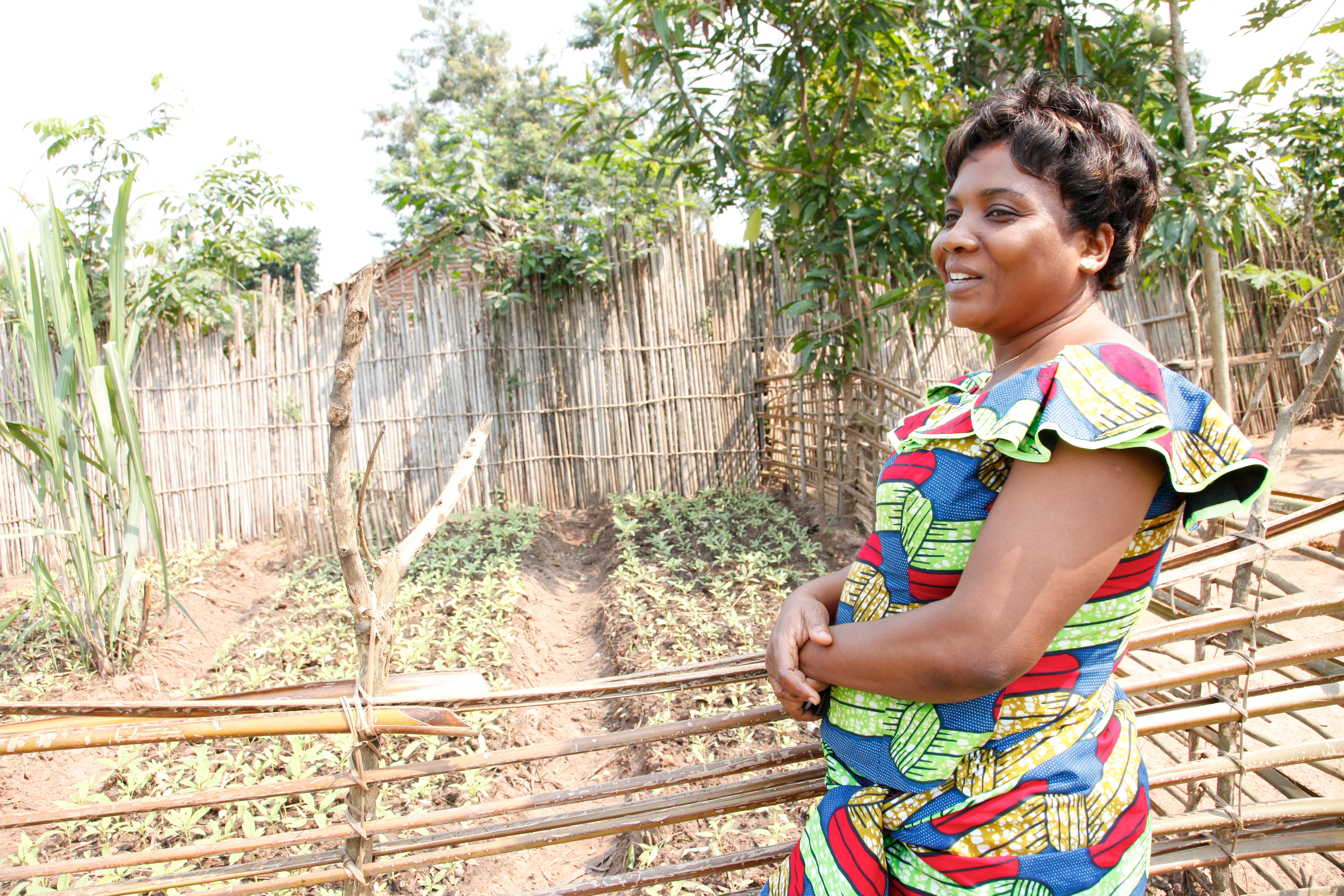
- in her garden
- Occupation: Politician
- Known for: leading a DRC territory
- Political party: Unified Lumumbist Party

Anne Mbusu Ngulu (born 20th century) was appointed as a Democratic Republic of the Congo administrator for the territory of Masi-Manimba.

== Life ==
Anne Mbusu who was the administrator appointed by former President Joseph Kabila Kabang to manage the territory of Masi-Manimba. She was one of the women entrusted with such a role in the DRC. The town elects seven national deputies and the majority recently were from the Unified Lumumbist Party.

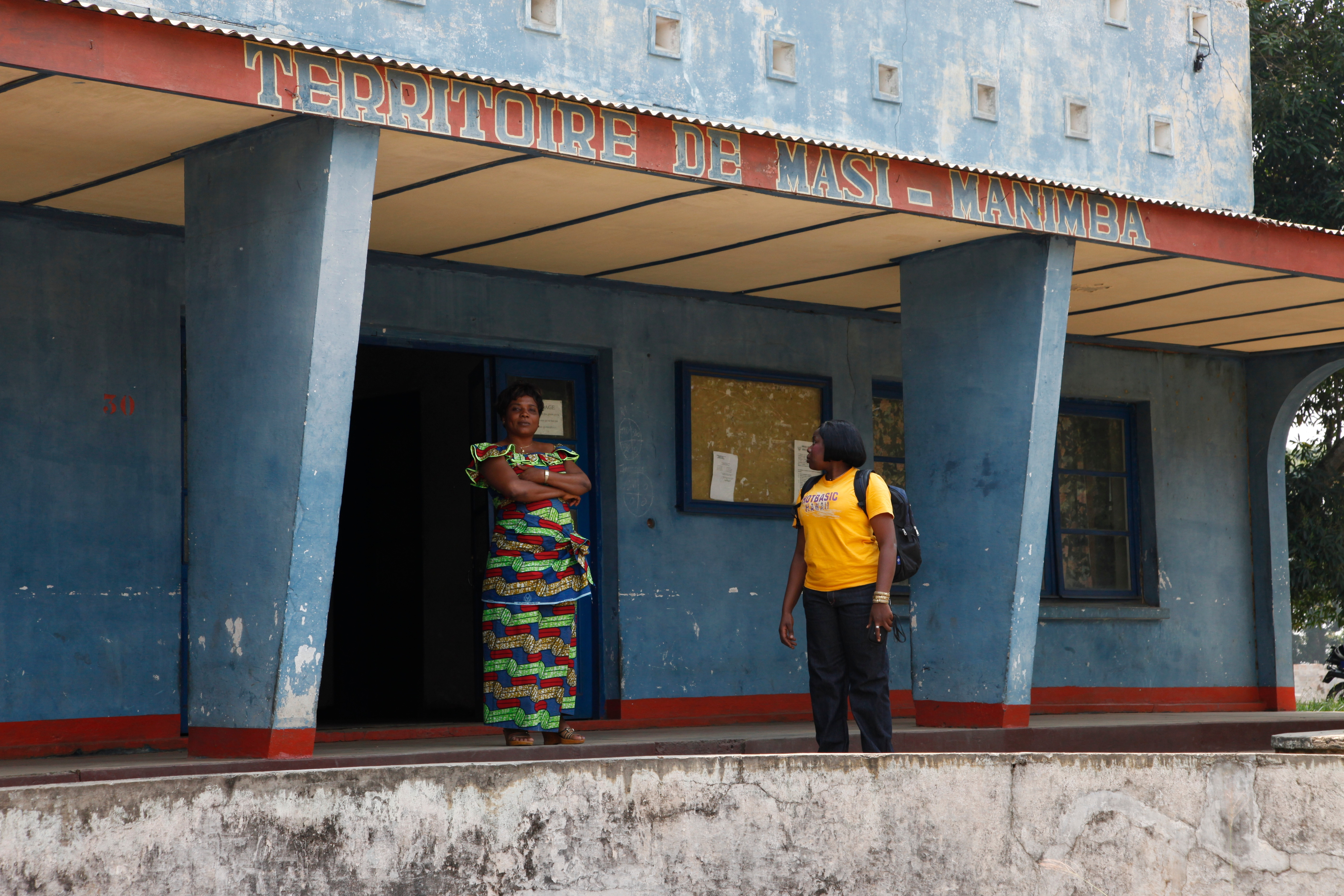
Mbusu in her territory of Masi-Manimba

Mbusu faced the problem of an outbreak of a disease, peste des petits ruminants, that killed thousands of the local goats. She also realised that there was malnutrition in her territory and she arranged for external help in tackling the problem in 2012. The United Nations arranged for advice and a team studied the problem and advised on how to increase nutrition. This included making milk from peanuts.
