= Moro, Papua New Guinea =

District in Northern Papua New Guinea in the Madang region

Moro is a district in Northern Papua New Guinea in the Madang region.
