= Mucuri =

Municipality of Bahia, Brazil

- Municipality
- The Municipality of Mucuri
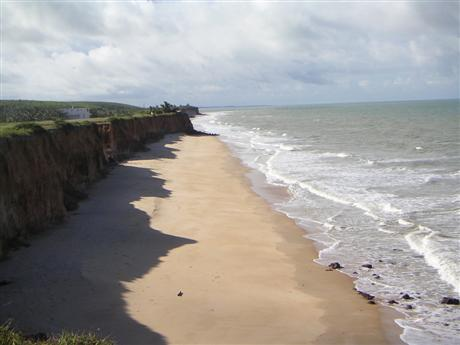
- Costa Dourada beach and its cliffs: the first beach in Bahia from south to north.

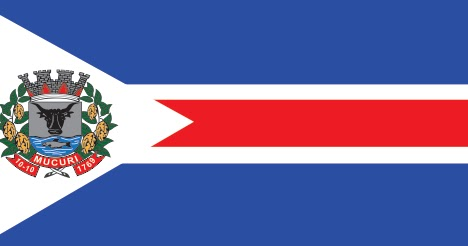
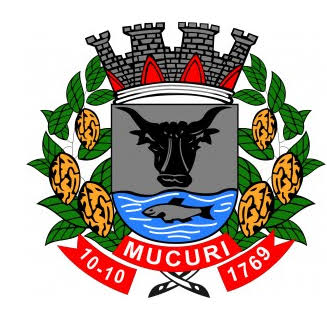
- Flag Coat of arms

- Location in Bahia
- Coordinates: 18°05′09″S 39°33′03″W
- Country: Brazil
- Region: Northeast
- State: Bahia
- Founded: 1938

Government
  - Mayor: Jose Carlos Simões (Dr Carlos) (PDT)

Area
  - Total: 1,774.763 km^{2} (685.240 sq mi)
- Elevation: 7 m (23 ft)

Population (2020)
  - Total: 42,251
  - Density: 20.1/km^{2} (52/sq mi)
- Time zone: UTC−3 (BRT)
- HDI (2000): 0.626 – medium

Mucuri is a city in the state of Bahia in Brazil. The estimated population in 2020 is 42,251 inhabitants. It is the southernmost city in Bahia as well as Brazil's Northeast region, and the only one from that state to border Espírito Santo.

The city contains part of the 1,503.75-hectare (3,715.8-acre) Córrego Grande Biological Reserve. The climate is tropical, warm and mostly humid, with one or two dry months. Average annual temperature is 22 to 24 °C (72 to 75 °F), and average annual rainfall is 1,250 to 1,500 millimetres (49 to 59 in).

Mucuri is served by Max Feffer Airport.
