= Masi-Manimba Airport =

- IATA: MSM; ICAO: FZCV

Summary
- Airport type: Public
- Serves: Masi-Manimba
- Elevation AMSL: 1,952 ft / 595 m
- Coordinates: 4°47′00″S 17°51′12″E

Map
- Location of the airport in Democratic Republic of the Congo

Runways
Direction	Length		Surface
Direction	m	ft	Surface
04/22	1,160	3,806	Grass
- Sources: Google Maps GCM

Masi-Manimba Airport (IATA: MSM, ICAO: FZCV) is an airport serving the town of Masi-Manimba in Kwilu Province, Democratic Republic of the Congo. The airport is 4 kilometres (2.5 mi) west of Masi-Manimba.

== See also ==
- Transport in the Democratic Republic of the Congo
- List of airports in the Democratic Republic of the Congo
