= Middleton Island =

Island in Alaska, United States

Coordinates: 59.44°N 146.33°W

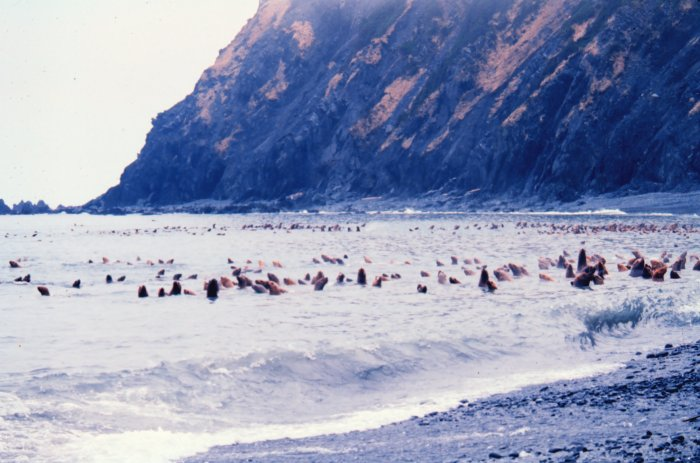
A raft of Steller sea lions off the coast of Middleton Island, 1978

Middleton Island is an island in the U.S. state of Alaska, located in the Pacific Ocean approximately 80 miles (130 km) southwest of Cordova. Most of the acreage on the island is owned by Chugach Alaska Corporation, a for-profit corporation. The island is also home of the unattended 200-acre (81 ha) Middleton Island Airport and NEXRAD weather radar (FAA), and the privately owned 182-acre (74 ha) Middleton Island Marine Biological Station with researchers resident year-round.

A World War II-era American transport ship beached on the island in 1942 where the wreck is still intact. The island was briefly home to Middleton Island Air Force Station, an early warning radar station, from 1958 until the station's closure in 1963. During the 1964 Alaska earthquake the island rose an additional 12 feet (3.7 m) above sea level expanding its acreage by about 45%.

== Natural history ==
The island is thought to be only about 5,000 years old, having formed recently due to a continental shelf area that is subject to tectonic uplift. During the 1964 Alaska earthquake, the second largest earthquake ever recorded on earth, the island rose an additional 12 feet (3.7 m) above sea level, converting submerged seafloor into new land and estuary, in the process expanding the size of the island from approximately 2,200 to 3,200 acres (890 to 1,290 ha), or 45%. The new land continues to evolve through longshore deposition, sedimentation, and plant succession.

According to the Institute for Seabird Research and Conservation:

Driven partly by changes wrought by the earthquake and partly by large-scale oceanographic factors, bird populations on Middleton are more dynamic than possibly anywhere else in Alaska. The island hosts substantial numbers of kittiwakes, cormorants, gulls, murres and puffins, but no species is stable–huge fluctuations, both up and down, have occurred since regular monitoring began in the 1970s.

The seabird population has risen and fallen dramatically ("bird populations on Middleton are dynamic"). The explanations for this include changes in the landscape brought by the 1964 earthquake which reduced the sea-edge cliff habitat; changes in food availability caused by natural and man-made factors (warmer years correlate with less food availability); a significant increase in the bald eagle predator population.

The island has a feral population of rabbits since the 1950s. The rabbits provide food for eagles and owls during the winter, but the population rebounds in the summer. There are no other naturally occurring mammals on or near the island, other than seals, sea lions, the occasional sea otter, and several species of whales.

== Cultural history ==
The island was historically used seasonally by Chugach and Eyak Indians. The earliest known permanent inhabitants were settlers in the fox-farming industry during the late 1890s through the 1920s. During World War II, the U.S. Coast Guard built a small communications station on the island, the first of successive U.S. Government operations to follow, including the Civil Aeronautics Administration, U.S. Air Force (Middleton Island Air Force Station), Federal Aviation Administration (Middleton Island Airport), and various wildlife and land management agencies. (Note: Agencies include: United States Fish and Wildlife Service (USFWS); Alaska Outer Continental Shelf Environmental Assessment Program (OCSEA); Alaska Maritime National Wildlife Refuge Seabird Monitoring (AMNWR))

Most of the acreage on the island is owned by Chugach Alaska Corporation, one of 13 Alaska Native regional corporations in the state. The Federal Aviation Administration retains some 200 acres in support of radar installations for weather and air traffic monitoring. The privately owned biological station (182 acres) is the other substantial holding.

== Middleton Island Marine Biological Station ==
Middleton Island Marine Biological Station studies seabirds and is located on 182 acres (74 ha) in and around the former Middleton Island Air Force Station. Researchers live on the island year round, plus visiting students and researchers. It is owned and managed by the Institute for Seabird Research and Conservation, it is the non-profit's primary holding and mission. Field operations are funded in part by Gulf Watch Alaska (Exxon-Valdez Oil Spill Trustee Council) and receive funding mainly through a cooperative agreement with the U.S. Geological Survey. Middleton Island has the longest running time series of seabird monitoring of any Alaska breeding site. It began in 1956, in anticipation of the Air Force base that would be built in 1958, when researcher Robert Rausch conducted the first floral and faunal survey of the island. As of 2024, the station reported between 2 and 12 researchers lived on the island year-round, the higher number in summer.

== SS Coldbrook ==
The SS Coldbrook was a Hog Islander merchant ship, built in 1919, that grounded off Middleton Island in 1942 after being chased ashore by a Japanese submarine, the captain choosing to beach the ship to save the lives of his crew. The ship could not be salvaged and remained battered in the surf. During the 1964 Alaska earthquake, the ground rose 12 feet (3.7 m), and the Coldbrook was left beached at high-tide and out of the pounding surf. The now 107-year-old rusting hull is home to thousands of nesting seabirds, which are studied by researchers at the Middleton Island Marine Biological Station.

== Climate ==
Middleton Island has a subpolar oceanic climate (Köppen: Cfc).

Climate data for Middleton Island, Alaska
Month	Jan	Feb	Mar	Apr	May	Jun	Jul	Aug	Sep	Oct	Nov	Dec	Year
Record high °F (°C)	46 (8)	46 (8)	47 (8)	51 (11)	63 (17)	67 (19)	70 (21)	72 (22)	62 (17)	59 (15)	53 (12)	46 (8)	72 (22)
Mean maximum °F (°C)	43.0 (6.1)	42.2 (5.7)	43.7 (6.5)	47.4 (8.6)	53.7 (12.1)	58.6 (14.8)	63.0 (17.2)	63.5 (17.5)	59.1 (15.1)	52.8 (11.6)	47.3 (8.5)	43.2 (6.2)	65.4 (18.6)
Mean daily maximum °F (°C)	36.2 (2.3)	36.2 (2.3)	37.9 (3.3)	42.1 (5.6)	46.2 (7.9)	51.4 (10.8)	56.4 (13.6)	57.8 (14.3)	54.5 (12.5)	47.3 (8.5)	42.1 (5.6)	37.6 (3.1)	45.5 (7.5)
Daily mean °F (°C)	33.3 (0.7)	33.3 (0.7)	34.9 (1.6)	38.5 (3.6)	42.9 (6.1)	47.9 (8.8)	52.8 (11.6)	54.4 (12.4)	51.1 (10.6)	44.1 (6.7)	39.3 (4.1)	34.6 (1.4)	42.2 (5.7)
Mean daily minimum °F (°C)	30.4 (−0.9)	30.3 (−0.9)	31.9 (−0.1)	34.9 (1.6)	39.5 (4.2)	44.3 (6.8)	49.2 (9.6)	51.0 (10.6)	47.7 (8.7)	40.9 (4.9)	36.5 (2.5)	31.6 (−0.2)	39.0 (3.9)
Mean minimum °F (°C)	19.6 (−6.9)	20.9 (−6.2)	22.9 (−5.1)	27.9 (−2.3)	34.5 (1.4)	40.3 (4.6)	45.1 (7.3)	46.3 (7.9)	41.7 (5.4)	34.1 (1.2)	27.9 (−2.3)	22.2 (−5.4)	14.5 (−9.7)
Record low °F (°C)	9 (−13)	6 (−14)	13 (−11)	14 (−10)	23 (−5)	36 (2)	42 (6)	42 (6)	36 (2)	29 (−2)	13 (−11)	12 (−11)	6 (−14)
Average precipitation inches (mm)	4.14 (105)	3.40 (86)	3.01 (76)	3.39 (86)	3.34 (85)	2.22 (56)	3.13 (80)	5.18 (132)	6.83 (173)	7.35 (187)	5.96 (151)	5.17 (131)	53.12 (1,349)
Average snowfall inches (cm)	6.8 (17)	6.5 (17)	6.0 (15)	2.7 (6.9)	0.1 (0.25)	0.0 (0.0)	0.0 (0.0)	0.0 (0.0)	0.0 (0.0)	0.8 (2.0)	2.0 (5.1)	7.5 (19)	32.4 (82)
Source: WRCC

== See also ==
- List of islands of Alaska
