= Middleton Island Airport =

- IATA: MDO; ICAO: PAMD; FAA LID: MDO

Summary
- Airport type: Public
- Serves: Middleton Island, Alaska
- Elevation AMSL: 100 ft / 30 m
- Coordinates: 59°26′59″N 146°18′26″W

Map
- Location of airport in Alaska

Runways
Direction	Length		Surface
Direction	ft	m	Surface
1/19	3,158	963	Gravel
12/30	1,500	457	Gravel/dirt

Statistics (2005)
- Aircraft operations: 150
- Source: Federal Aviation Administration

Middleton Island Airport (IATA: MDO, ICAO: PAMD, FAA LID: MDO) is a public-use airport located on Middleton Island, which is located in the Gulf of Alaska, approximately 75 miles (121 km) southwest of Cordova, Alaska.

== Facilities and aircraft ==
Middleton Island Airport covers an area of 5,500 acres (2,226 ha) at an elevation of 100 feet (30 m) above mean sea level. It has two runways: 1/19 is 3,158 by 115 feet (963 x 35 m) with a gravel surface; 12/30 is 1,500 by 125 feet (457 x 38 m) with a gravel and dirt surface. For the 12-month period ending December 31, 2005, the airport had 150 aircraft operations, an average of 12 per month: 67% air taxi and 33% general aviation.

== See also ==
- List of airports in Alaska
