= Melfa, Virginia =

- Town
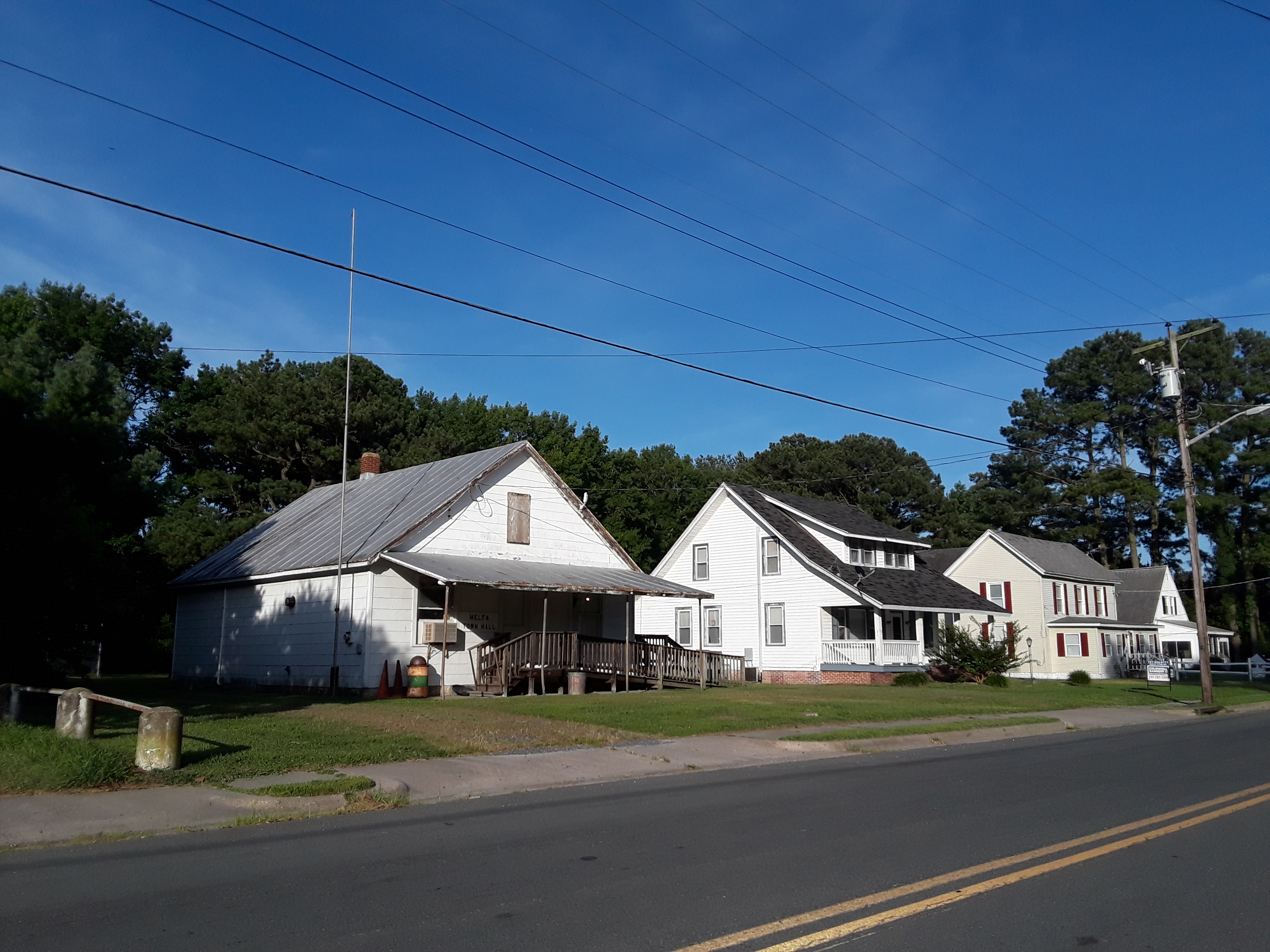
- Houses on Main Street, July 2018

- Location in Accomack County and the state of Virginia.
- Coordinates: 37°38′59″N 75°44′29″W
- Country: United States
- State: Virginia
- County: Accomack

Area
  - Total: 0.29 sq mi (0.75 km^{2})
  - Land: 0.29 sq mi (0.75 km^{2})
  - Water: 0 sq mi (0.00 km^{2})
- Elevation: 49 ft (15 m)

Population (2020)
  - Total: 396
  - Density: 1,400/sq mi (530/km^{2})
- Time zone: UTC−5 (Eastern (EST))
  - Summer (DST): UTC−4 (EDT)
- ZIP code: 23410
- Area codes: 757, 948
- FIPS code: 51-50984
- GNIS feature ID: 1493276

Melfa is a town in Accomack County on the Eastern Shore of Virginia, United States. The population was 396 at the 2020 census.

== Geography ==
Melfa is located at 37°38′59″N 75°44′29″W (37.649836, −75.741523).

According to the United States Census Bureau, the town has a total area of 0.3 square mile (0.7 km^{2}), all land. It rests at an elevation of 49 feet.

== Demographics ==
Historical population
Census	Pop.	Note	%±
1960	409		—
1970	459		12.2%
1980	391		−14.8%
1990	428		9.5%
2000	450		5.1%
2010	408		−9.3%
2020	396		−2.9%
U.S. Decennial Census

At the 2000 census there were 450 people, 183 households, and 131 families living in the town. The population density was 1,654.6 people per square mile (643.5/km^{2}). There were 205 housing units at an average density of 753.8 per square mile (293.2/km^{2}). The racial makeup of the town was 82.44% White, 15.78% African American, 0.22% Native American, 1.33% from other races, and 0.22% from two or more races. Hispanic or Latino of any race were 2.22%.

Of the 183 households 32.2% had children under the age of 18 living with them, 60.1% were married couples living together, 10.4% had a female householder with no husband present, and 28.4% were non-families. 22.4% of households were one person and 10.4% were one person aged 65 or older. The average household size was 2.46 and the average family size was 2.93.

The age distribution was 22.4% under the age of 18, 9.1% from 18 to 24, 29.8% from 25 to 44, 21.6% from 45 to 64, and 17.1% 65 or older. The median age was 38 years. For every 100 females, there were 83.7 males. For every 100 females aged 18 and over, there were 77.2 males.

The median household income was $37,361 and the median family income was $44,583. Males had a median income of $27,500 versus $20,833 for females. The per capita income for the town was $18,660. About 8.1% of families and 9.2% of the population were below the poverty line, including 10.8% of those under age 18 and 13.9% of those age 65 or over.

== Education ==
Melfa is served by Accomack County Public Schools, which is the only school district in the county.

Eastern Shore Community College is in an unincorporated area near Melfa and has a Melfa mailing address.

== Transportation ==
Accomack County Airport is in an unincorporated area near Melfa.
