= Masi-Manimba =

- Commune
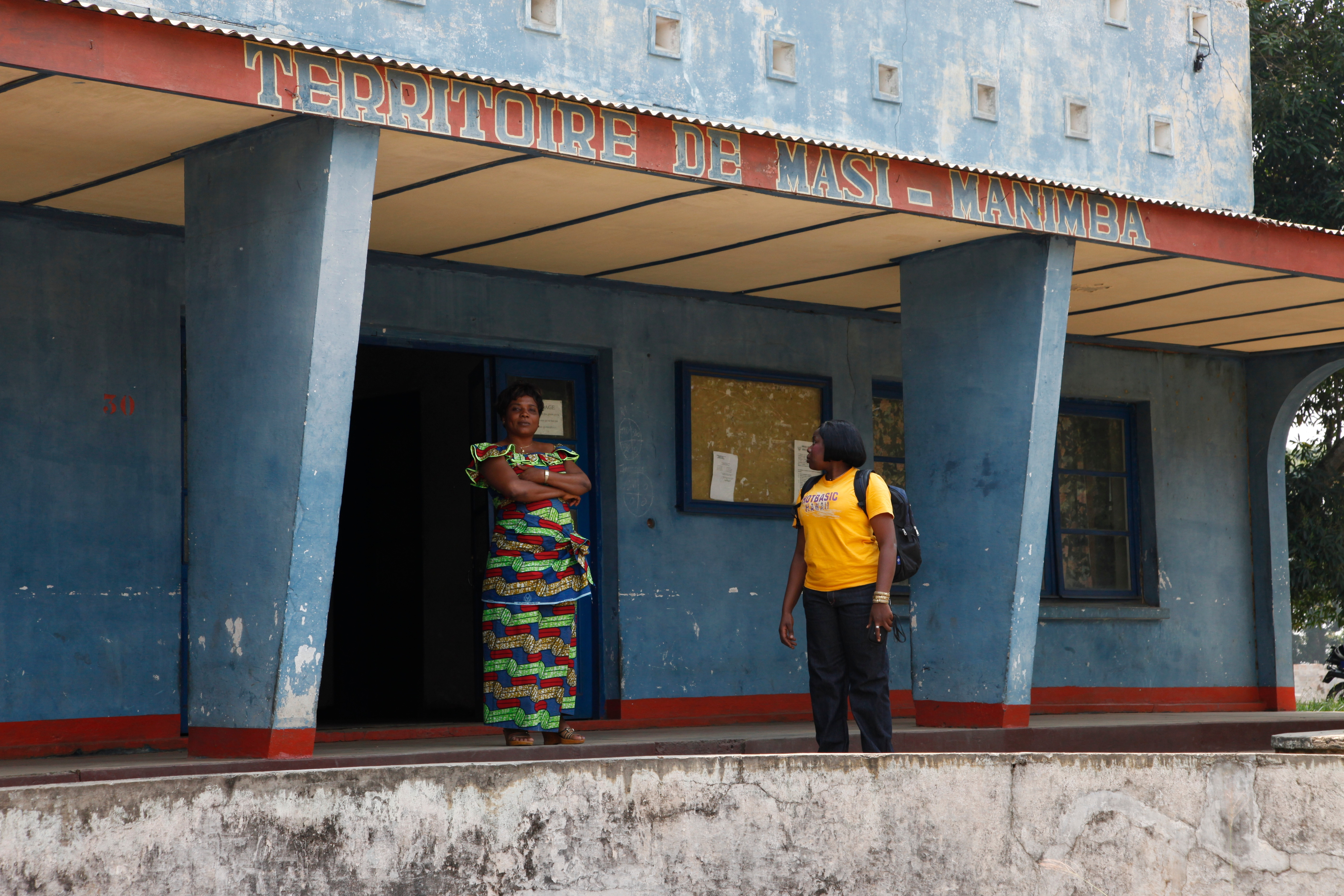

- Location in the Democratic Republic of the Congo
- Coordinates: 4.778995°S 17.907715°E
- Country: DR Congo
- Province: Kwilu
- Territory: Masi-Manimba
- Elevation: 595 m (1,952 ft)

Population (2012)
  - Total: 31,802
- Time zone: UTC+1 (West Africa Time)
- Website: www.masimanimba.net

Masi-Manimba is a town in Kwilu Province, Democratic Republic of the Congo, the headquarters of the Masi-Manimba Territory. As of 2012 the population was estimated to be 31,802.

The town lies on the Lukula River, a tributary of the Kwilu River. It is on the road between Kenge to the west and Kikwit to the east. Masi-Manimba is served by Masi-Manimba Airport (MSM), with a runway length of 4,100 feet (1,200 m) and an altitude of 1,952 feet (595 m).

The area was led by Anne Mbusu who was the administrator appointed by former President Joseph Kabila Kabang. She was one of the women entrusted with such a role in the DRC. The town elects seven national deputies and the majority recently were from the Unified Lumumbist Party.
