= Marlboro Airport =

Marlboro Airport (Closed)
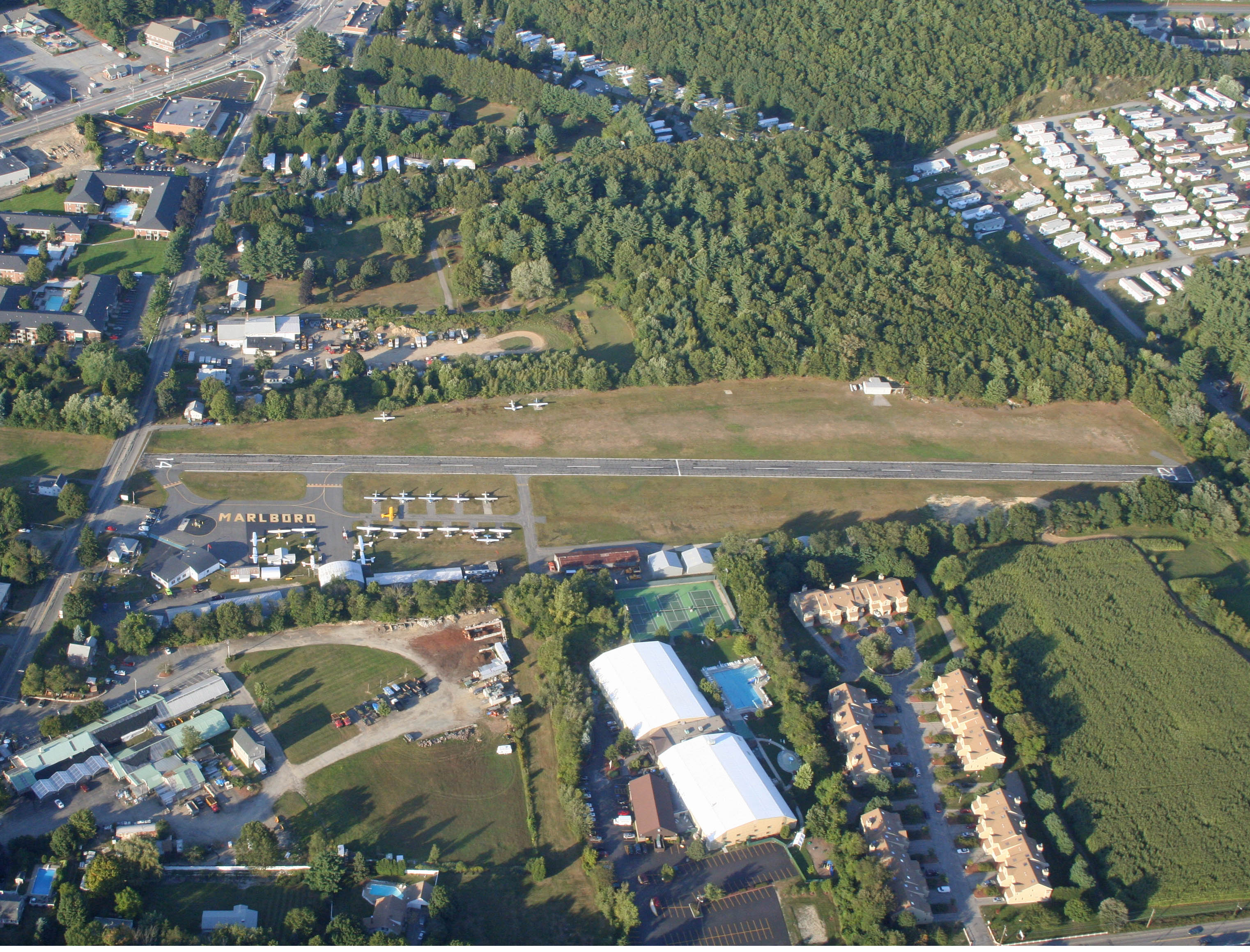
- Marlboro Airport when it was open, with a helicopter that just took off
- IATA: MXG; ICAO: none; FAA LID: 9B1

Summary
- Airport type: Public
- Operator: Sandra A. Stetson
- Serves: Marlborough, Massachusetts
- Location: Marlborough, Massachusetts
- Elevation AMSL: 285 ft (87 m)
- Coordinates: 42°20′35.4″N 71°30′32.4″W

Map
- Location of airport in Massachusetts

Runways
Direction	Length		Surface
Direction	ft	m	Surface
14/32	1,659	506	Asphalt

Marlboro Airport, (IATA: MXG, FAA LID: 9B1) in Marlborough, Massachusetts, was a public airport that was in operation from 1922 to 2019.

== History ==
Marlboro Airport was founded in 1922, the era when barnstormers flew "by the seat of their pants." It was the oldest continuously operating commercial field in the Commonwealth of Massachusetts until its closure. There was one fixed-base operator, Don's Flying Service, named for former airport manager Don LaCouture Sr. and offered fixed-wing and helicopter flight instruction, tie-downs and hangar space, and major and minor aircraft repairs.

Chapter 673 of the Experimental Aircraft Association was based at Marlboro Airport.

In April 2010, the airport owner sued the government claiming that the airport's runway was damaged by heavy vehicles accompanying President Obama's secret service fleet. The government settled with the airport owner's widow a year after his death., however the funds were never used to repave the airport which was closed shortly thereafter.

Its final owner was Sandra A. Stetson, widow of prior owner G. Robert Stetson, Jr. Robert died on April 27, 2012, at the age of 66. It had one runway, and at the end of its life averaged 37 flights per day with approximately 40 aircraft based on its field. In December 2018, Sandra Stetson sold the airport to Capital Group Properties, which plans to redevelop the site into the Airport Industrial Park.
