= Manguna Airport =

Airport in Manguna, East New Britain, Papua New Guinea

- IATA: MFO; ICAO: AYNG

Summary
- Location: Manguna, Papua New Guinea
- Elevation AMSL: 120 ft / 37 m
- Coordinates: 5°34′39.6″S 151°47′33″E

Map
- Location of airport in Papua New Guinea

Runways
Direction	Length		Surface
Direction	m	ft	Surface
12/30	700	2,297
- Source: PNG Airstrip Guide

Manguna Airport is an airfield serving Manguna, in the East New Britain Province of Papua New Guinea.
