= Mucuri Airport =

Max Feffer Airport Aeroporto Max Feffer
- IATA: MVS; ICAO: SNMU; LID: BA0142

Summary
- Airport type: Private
- Serves: Mucuri
- Time zone: BRT (UTC−03:00)
- Elevation AMSL: 84 m / 276 ft
- Coordinates: 18°02′58″S 039°51′48″W

Map
- Location in Brazil

Runways
Direction	Length		Surface
Direction	m	ft	Surface
05/23	1,400	4,593	Asphalt
- Sources: ANAC, DECEA

Max Feffer Airport (IATA: MVS, ICAO: SNMU), is the airport serving Mucuri, Brazil.

== Airlines and destinations ==
No scheduled flights operate at this airport.

== Access ==
The airport is located 33 km (21 mi) from downtown Mucuri.

== See also ==
- List of airports in Brazil
