= Mount Pleasant Airport (Utah) =

- IATA: ~~MSD~~; ICAO: none; FAA LID: ~~43U~~

Summary
- Airport type: Public
- Owner: City of Mount Pleasant
- Serves: Mount Pleasant, Utah
- Elevation AMSL: 5,830 ft / 1,777 m
- Coordinates: 39°31′36″N 111°28′34″W

Map
- Location of airport in Utah

Runways
Direction	Length		Surface
Direction	ft	m	Surface
2/20	4,242	1,293	Asphalt

Statistics (2009)
- Aircraft operations: 2,410
- Based aircraft: 5
- Source: Federal Aviation Administration

Mount Pleasant Airport (IATA: MSD, FAA LID: 43U) was a city-owned, public use airport located two nautical miles (4 km) southwest of the central business district of Mount Pleasant, a city in Sanpete County, Utah, United States. The airport closed in January 2016.

== Facilities and aircraft ==
Mount Pleasant Airport covered an area of 361 acres (146 ha) at an elevation of 5,830 feet (1,777 m) above mean sea level. It had one runway designated 2/20 with an asphalt surface measuring 4,242 by 60 feet (1,293 x 18 m).

For the 12-month period ending December 31, 2009, the airport had 2,410 aircraft operations, an average of 200 per month: 99% general aviation and 1% air taxi. At that time there were five single-engine aircraft based at this airport.
