= Accomack County Airport =

Airport in Virginia, United States of America

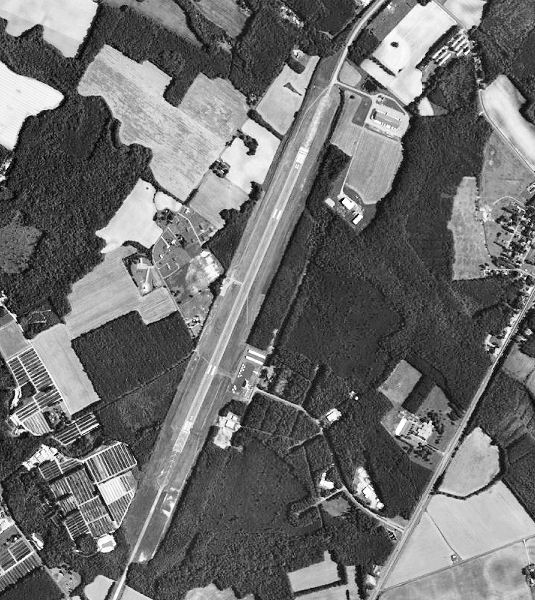
- 1995 USGS Photo
- IATA: MFV; ICAO: KMFV; FAA LID: MFV

Summary
- Airport type: Public
- Owner: Accomack County Airport Commission
- Location: Accomack County (near Melfa), Virginia, U.S.
- Elevation AMSL: 47 ft (14 m)
- Coordinates: 37°38′48″N 075°45′39″W

Map
- Location of airport in Virginia

Runways
Direction	Length		Surface
Direction	ft	m	Surface
03/21	5,000	1,524	Asphalt

Statistics (2008)
- Aircraft operations: 14,056
- Based aircraft: 23
- Source: Federal Aviation Administration

Accomack County Airport (IATA: MFV, ICAO: KMFV, FAA LID: MFV) is a county-owned public-use airport in unincorporated Accomack County, Virginia, United States, located 1 mile (1.6 km) west of the central business district in Melfa, a town in the county.

== History ==
The airport was built by the United States Army Air Forces about 1942, and was known as Melfa Flight Strip. It was an emergency landing airfield for military aircraft on training flights. It was closed after World War II, and was turned over for local government use by the War Assets Administration (WAA).
Between April 1957 and October 1958 the north end of runway 21, which is now a displaced threshold section, was used for tests by the Naval Ordnance Laboratory.
These tests involved an Vought F7U Cutlass dropping simulated atomic anti-runway bombs, to test for penetration necessary for effectiveness.
The repairs to the displaced threshold, still visible on aerial photographs, are impacts from these tests.

== Facilities and aircraft ==
Accomack County Airport covers an area of 100 acres which contains one runway designated 3/21 with a 5,000 x 100 ft (1,524 x 30 m) asphalt surface. For the 12-month period ending September 30, 2009, the airport had 14,056 aircraft operations, an average of 38 per day: 84% general aviation and 8% air taxi and 9% military. At that time there were 23 aircraft based at this airport: 22 single-engine and 1 multi-engine.
