= Mount Pleasant Regional Airport (South Carolina) =

Mount Pleasant Regional Airport Faison Field
- IATA: none; ICAO: KLRO; FAA LID: LRO

Summary
- Airport type: Public
- Owner: Charleston County Aviation Authority
- Serves: Mount Pleasant, South Carolina
- Location: 700 Faison Parkway Mt. Pleasant, SC 29464
- Elevation AMSL: 12 ft / 4 m
- Coordinates: 32°53′52″N 79°46′58″W
- Interactive map of Mount Pleasant Regional Airport

Runways
Direction	Length		Surface
Direction	ft	m	Surface
17/35	3,700	1,128	Asphalt

Statistics (2019)
- Aircraft operations: 18,250
- Based aircraft: 54
- Source: Federal Aviation Administration

Mount Pleasant Regional Airport (ICAO: KLRO, FAA LID: LRO, formerly 8S5), also known as Faison Field, is a public airport located 9 nmi (17 km) northeast of the central business district of Mount Pleasant, a town in Charleston County, South Carolina, United States. It is owned by the Charleston County Aviation Authority. It was formerly the East Cooper Airport.

Although most U.S. airports use the same three-letter location identifier for the FAA and IATA, this airport is assigned LRO by the FAA but has no designation from the IATA.

== Facilities and aircraft ==
Mount Pleasant Regional Airport covers an area of 300 acres (120 ha) which contains one asphalt paved runway (17/35) measuring 3,700 x 75 ft (1,128 x 23 m).

For the 12-month period ending November 15, 2019, the airport had 18,250 aircraft operations, an average of 50 per day: 94% general aviation, 5% air taxi and 1% military. There are 54 aircraft based at this airport: 94% single engine and 6% multi-engine.

== See also ==
- List of airports in South Carolina
