= Mount Pleasant Municipal Airport (Michigan) =

- IATA: MOP; ICAO: KMOP; FAA LID: MOP

Summary
- Airport type: Public
- Owner: City of Mt. Pleasant
- Location: Mount Pleasant, Michigan
- Elevation AMSL: 755 ft / 230 m
- Coordinates: 43°37′18″N 084°44′15″W

Map
- Location of airport in Michigan MOP (the United States)

Runways
Direction	Length		Surface
Direction	ft	m	Surface
09/27	5,000	1,524	Asphalt
05/23	2,500	762	Turf

Statistics (2020)
- Aircraft operations: 10,220
- Based aircraft: 17
- Source: Federal Aviation Administration

Mount Pleasant Municipal Airport (IATA: MOP, ICAO: KMOP, FAA LID: MOP) is a city-owned public-use airport located two miles (3 km) northeast of the central business district of Mount Pleasant, a city in Isabella County, Michigan, United States. The airport became active in 1940. It serves general aviation for Mount Pleasant and the surrounding area. It is included in the Federal Aviation Administration (FAA) National Plan of Integrated Airport Systems for 2017–2021, in which it is categorized as a local general aviation facility.

The airport is home to a chapter of the experimental aircraft association. It holds regular airshows to showcase antique, homebuilt, and classic cars and aircraft.

== Facilities and aircraft ==
Mount Pleasant Municipal Airport covers an area of 344 acres (139 ha) which contains two runways:

- Runway 09/27: 5,000 x 100 ft (1,524 x 30 m); surface: asphalt
- Runway 05/23: 2,500 x 160 ft (762 x 49 m); surface: turf

The airport has a fixed-base operator that sells fuel – both avgas and jet fuel – and offers amenities such as a conference room and crew lounge, snooze rooms, and more.

For the 12-month period ending December 31, 2020, the airport had 10,220 aircraft operations, an average of 22 per day. This included 99% general aviation and 1% military. At the time, there are 17 aircraft based at this airport: 16 airplanes, including 15 single-engine and 1 multi-engine, and 1 jet airplane.

== See also ==
- List of airports in Michigan
