= Mount Pleasant Regional Airport (Texas) =

- IATA: MPS; ICAO: KOSA; FAA LID: OSA

Summary
- Airport type: Public
- Owner: City of Mount Pleasant
- Serves: Mount Pleasant, Texas
- Elevation AMSL: 364 ft / 111 m
- Coordinates: 33°05′49″N 094°57′42″W
- Website: MountPleasantAirport.com

Map
- Location of airport in Texas

Runways
Direction	Length		Surface
Direction	ft	m	Surface
17/35	6,004	1,830	Asphalt

Helipads
Number	Length		Surface
Number	ft	m	Surface
H1	44	13	Concrete

Statistics (2010)
- Aircraft operations: 13,200
- Based aircraft: 47
- Source: Federal Aviation Administration

Mount Pleasant Regional Airport (IATA: MPS, ICAO: KOSA, FAA LID: OSA) is a city-owned, public-use airport located three nautical miles (6 km) south of the central business district of Mount Pleasant, a city in Titus County, Texas, United States. It is included in the National Plan of Integrated Airport Systems for 2011–2015, which categorized it as a general aviation facility.

== Facilities and aircraft ==
Mount Pleasant Regional Airport covers an area of 284 acres (115 ha) at an elevation of 364 feet (111 m) above mean sea level. It has one runway designated 17/35 with an asphalt surface measuring 6,004 by 100 feet (1,830 x 30 m). It also has one helipad designated H1 with a concrete surface measuring 44 by 44 feet (13 x 13 m).

For the 12-month period ending August 13, 2010, the airport had 13,200 general aviation aircraft operations, an average of 36 per day. At that time there were 47 aircraft based at this airport: 72.3% single-engine, 23.4% multi-engine, and 4.3% jet.

The Mid America Flight Museum is located at the airport.

== See also ==
- List of airports in Texas
