= New York (state) =

U.S. state

- State
- Flag Seal
- Nickname: The Empire State
- Motto(s): Excelsior (Latin) 'Ever upward'
- Anthem: "I Love New York"
- Location of New York within the United States
- Country: United States
- Before statehood: Province of New York
- Admitted to the Union: July 26, 1788 (11th)
- Capital: Albany
- Largest city: New York
- Largest county or equivalent: Kings (Brooklyn)
- Largest metro and urban areas: New York metropolitan area

Government
  - Governor: Kathy Hochul (D)
  - Lieutenant Governor: Antonio Delgado (D)
- Legislature: New York State Legislature
  - Upper house: State Senate
  - Lower house: State Assembly
- Judiciary: New York Court of Appeals
- U.S. senators: Chuck Schumer (D); Kirsten Gillibrand (D)
- U.S. House delegation: 19 Democrats; 7 Republicans; (list)

Area
  - Total: 54,555 sq mi (141,298 km^{2})
  - Land: 47,126 sq mi (122,057 km^{2})
  - Water: 7,430 sq mi (19,240 km^{2}) 13.6%
  - Rank: 27th

Dimensions
  - Length: 330 mi (530 km)
  - Width: 283 mi (455 km)
- Elevation: 980 ft (300 m)
- Highest elevation (Mount Marcy (Note: Elevation adjusted to North American Vertical Datum of 1988)): 5,344 ft (1,629 m)
- Lowest elevation (Atlantic Ocean): 0 ft (0 m)

Population (2025)
  - Total: ▲20,002,427
  - Rank: 4th
  - Density: 428.66/sq mi (165.51/km^{2})
  - Rank: 8th
  - Median household income: ▼$82,100 (2023)
  - Income rank: 14th
- Demonym: New Yorker

Language
  - Spoken language: Language spoken at home: English: 69%; Spanish: 15%; Chinese: 3%; Russian: 1%; Yiddish, Pennsylvania Dutch or other West Germanic languages: 1%; Haitian Creole: 0.9%; Bengali: 0.9%; French (incl. Cajun): 0.7%; Arabic: 0.7%; Italian 0.6%; Igbo, Yoruba, Twi, or other languages of Western Africa: 0.5%; Korean: 0.5%; Other Indo-European languages: 0.5%; Urdu: 0.4%; Tagalog (incl. Filipino): 0.4%; Polish: 0.4%; Hindi: 0.4%
- Time zone: UTC– 05:00 (EST)
  - Summer (DST): UTC– 04:00 (EDT)
- USPS abbreviation: NY
- ISO 3166 code: US-NY
- Traditional abbreviation: N.Y.
- Latitude: 40° 30′ N to 45° 1′ N
- Longitude: 71° 51′ W to 79° 46′ W
- Website: ny.gov

State symbols of New York
List of state symbols
- Flag of New York

- Seal of New York

- Coat of arms of New York
- Slogan: I Love New York

Living insignia
- Bird: Eastern bluebird
- Fish: Brook trout (fresh water), Striped bass (salt water)
- Flower: Rose
- Fruit: Apple
- Insect: Nine-spotted ladybug
- Mammal: North American beaver
- Reptile: Common snapping turtle
- Tree: Sugar maple, Lilac bush

Inanimate insignia
- Beverage: Milk
- Food: Yogurt
- Fossil: Eurypterus remipes
- Gemstone: Garnet
- Shell: Bay scallop
- Sport: Baseball

State route marker

State quarter
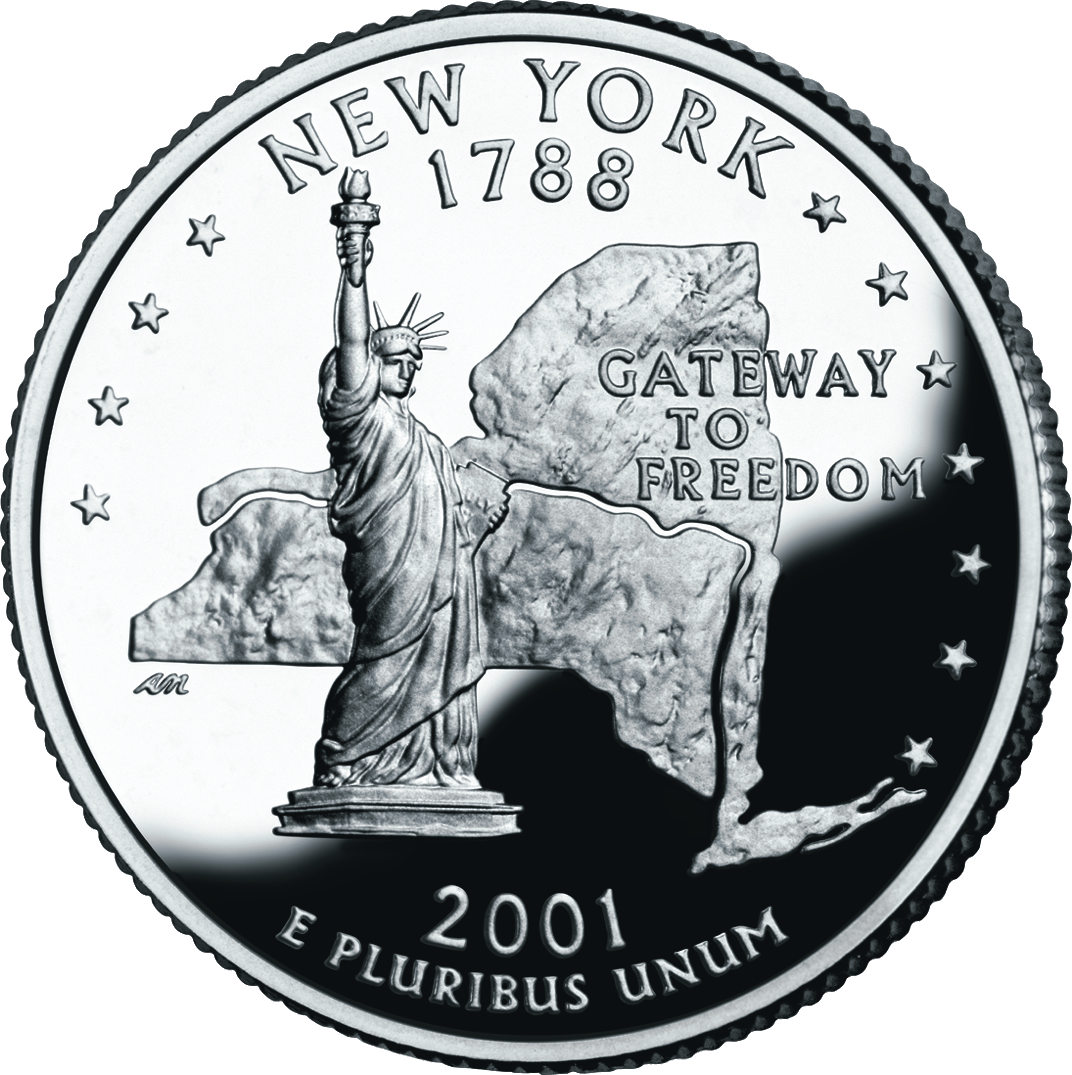
- Released in 2001

New York, also called New York State, (Note: To distinguish it from its largest city, also called New York) is a state located in the Northeastern United States. Bordering New England to its east, Pennsylvania and New Jersey to the south, and Canada to its north, New York extends into both the Atlantic Ocean and the Great Lakes. (Note: New England states bordering New York are Connecticut, Massachusetts, and Vermont, and it shares a maritime border with Rhode Island. The Canadian province of Quebec is to the north, and Ontario to the northwest. Lake Ontario is to the north and Lake Erie to the west. The Atlantic Ocean touches Long Island in the extreme southeast part of the state.) It is the fourth-most populous state in the United States, with over 20 million residents, and the 27th-largest state by area, with a total area of 54,556 square miles (141,300 km^{2}).

New York has a varied geography. The southeastern part of the state, known as Downstate, encompasses New York City, Long Island, and the cities, suburbs, and wealthy areas of the lower Hudson Valley. New York City is the most populous city in the United States; Long Island, with approximately 40% of the state's population, is the nation's most populous island. These areas are the center of the expansive New York metropolitan area and account for approximately two-thirds of the state's population. The larger Upstate area spreads from the Great Lakes to Lake Champlain and includes the Adirondack Mountains and the Catskill Mountains (part of the wider Appalachian Mountains). The east–west Mohawk River Valley bisects the more mountainous regions of Upstate and flows into the north–south Hudson River valley near the state capital of Albany. Western New York, which is sometimes considered to be a separate region from the Upstate, is home to the cities of Buffalo and Rochester, and is part of the Great Lakes region, bordering Lake Ontario and Lake Erie. Central New York is anchored by the city of Syracuse; between the central and western parts of the state, the Finger Lakes are a prominent landmark and tourist destination. To the south, along the state border with Pennsylvania, the Southern Tier sits atop the Allegheny Plateau, representing some of the northernmost reaches of Appalachia.

New York was one of the original Thirteen Colonies that went on to form the United States. The area of present-day New York had been inhabited by tribes of the Algonquians and the Haudenosaunee Native Americans for several thousand years by the time the earliest Europeans arrived. Stemming from Henry Hudson's expedition in 1609, the Dutch established the multiethnic colony of New Netherland in 1621. England seized the colony from the Dutch in 1664, renaming it the Province of New York. Upstate New York was fought over between the British and the French during the French and Indian War from 1754 to 1763. During the American Revolutionary War, a group of colonists eventually succeeded in establishing independence, and the state ratified the then new United States Constitution in 1788. From the early 19th century, New York's development of its interior, beginning with the construction of the Erie Canal, gave it incomparable advantages over other regions of the United States. The state built its political, cultural, and economic ascendancy over the next century, earning it the nickname of the "Empire State". Although deindustrialization eroded a portion of the state's economy in the second half of the 20th century, New York in the 21st century continues to be considered as a global node of creativity and entrepreneurship, social tolerance, and environmental sustainability.

The state attracts visitors from all over the globe, with the highest count of any U.S. state in 2022. Many of its landmarks are well known, including four out of ten of the world's most-visited tourist attractions in 2013: Times Square, Central Park, Niagara Falls, and Grand Central Terminal. New York is home to approximately 200 colleges and universities, including Ivy League members Columbia University and Cornell University, and the expansive State University of New York, which is among the largest university systems in the nation. New York City is home to the headquarters of the United Nations, and it is sometimes described as the world's most important city, the cultural, financial, and media epicenter, and the capital of the world.

== History ==
=== Native American history ===
Prior to European settlement, New York was dominated by Iroquoian (purple) and Algonquian (red) tribes.

The Native American tribes in what is now New York were predominantly Haudenosaunee and Algonquian. Long Island was divided roughly in half between the Algonquian Wampanoag and Lenape peoples. The Lenape also controlled most of the region surrounding New York Harbor. North of the Lenape was a third Algonquian nation, the Mohicans. Starting north of them, from east to west, were two Iroquoian nations: the Mohawk—part of the original Five Nations of the Haudenosaunee, and the Petun. South of them, divided roughly along Appalachia, were the Susquehannock and the Erie.

Many of the Wampanoag and Mohican peoples were caught up in King Philip's War, a joint effort of many New England tribes to push Europeans off their land. After the death of their leader, Chief Philip Metacomet, most of those peoples fled inland, splitting into the Abenaki and the Schaghticoke peoples. Many of the Mohicans remained in the region until the 1800s, however, a small group known as the Ouabano migrated southwest into West Virginia at an earlier time. They may have merged with the Shawnee.

The Mohawk and Susquehannock were the most militaristic. Trying to corner trade with the Europeans, they targeted other tribes. The Mohawk were also known for refusing European settlement on their land and discriminating against any of their people who converted to Christianity. They posed a major threat to the Abenaki and Mohicans, while the Susquehannock briefly conquered the Lenape in the 1600s. The most devastating event of the century, however, was the Beaver Wars.

From approximately 1640–1680, the Haudenosaunee peoples waged campaigns which extended from modern-day Michigan to Virginia against Algonquian and Siouan tribes, as well as each other. The aim was to control more land for animal trapping, a career most natives had turned to in hopes of trading with Europeans first. This completely changed the ethnography of the region, and most large game was hunted out before Europeans ever fully explored the land. Still, afterward, the Haudenosaunee Confederacy offered shelter to refugees of the Mascouten, Erie, Chonnonton, Tutelo, Saponi, and Tuscarora nations. The Tuscarora became the sixth nation of the Haudenosaunee in around 1720.

In the 1700s, the Haudenosaunee would take in the remaining Susquehannock of Pennsylvania after they were decimated in the French and Indian War. Most of these other groups assimilated and eventually ceased to exist as separate tribes. Then, after the American Revolution, a large group of Seneca split off and returned to Ohio, becoming known as the Mingo Seneca. The current Six Nations of the Haudenosaunee Confederacy include the Seneca, Cayuga, Onondaga, Oneida, Tuscarora and Mohawk. The Haudenosaunee fought for both sides during the Revolutionary War; afterwards many pro-British Haudenosaunee migrated to Canada. Today, the Haudenosaunee still live in several enclaves across New York and Ontario.

Meanwhile, the Lenape formed a close relationship with William Penn. However, upon Penn's death, his sons managed to take over much of their lands and banish them to Ohio. When the U.S. drafted the Indian Removal Act, the Lenape were further moved to Missouri, and the Mohicans were sent to Wisconsin.

In 1778, the United States relocated the Nanticoke from the Delmarva Peninsula to the former Haudenosaunee lands south of Lake Ontario, though they did not stay long. Mostly, they chose to migrate into Canada and merge with the Haudenosaunee, although some moved west and merged with the Lenape.

=== 16th century ===
In 1524, Giovanni da Verrazzano, an Italian explorer in the service of the French crown, explored the Atlantic coast of North America between the Carolinas and Newfoundland, including New York Harbor and Narragansett Bay. On April 17, 1524, Verrazzano entered New York Bay, by way of the strait now called the Narrows into the northern bay which he named Santa Margherita, in honor of the King of France's sister. Verrazzano described it as "a vast coastline with a deep delta in which every kind of ship could pass" and he adds: "that it extends inland for a league and opens up to form a beautiful lake. This vast sheet of water swarmed with native boats." He landed on the tip of Manhattan and possibly on the furthest point of Long Island. Verrazzano's stay was interrupted by a storm which pushed him north towards Martha's Vineyard.

In 1540, French traders from New France built a chateau on Castle Island, within present-day Albany; it was abandoned the following year due to flooding. In 1614, the Dutch, under the command of Hendrick Corstiaensen, rebuilt the French chateau, which they called Fort Nassau. Fort Nassau was the first Dutch settlement in North America, and was located along the Hudson River, also within present-day Albany. The small fort served as a trading post and warehouse. Located on the Hudson River flood plain, the rudimentary fort was washed away by flooding in 1617, and abandoned for good after Fort Orange (New Netherland) was built nearby in 1623.

=== 17th century ===
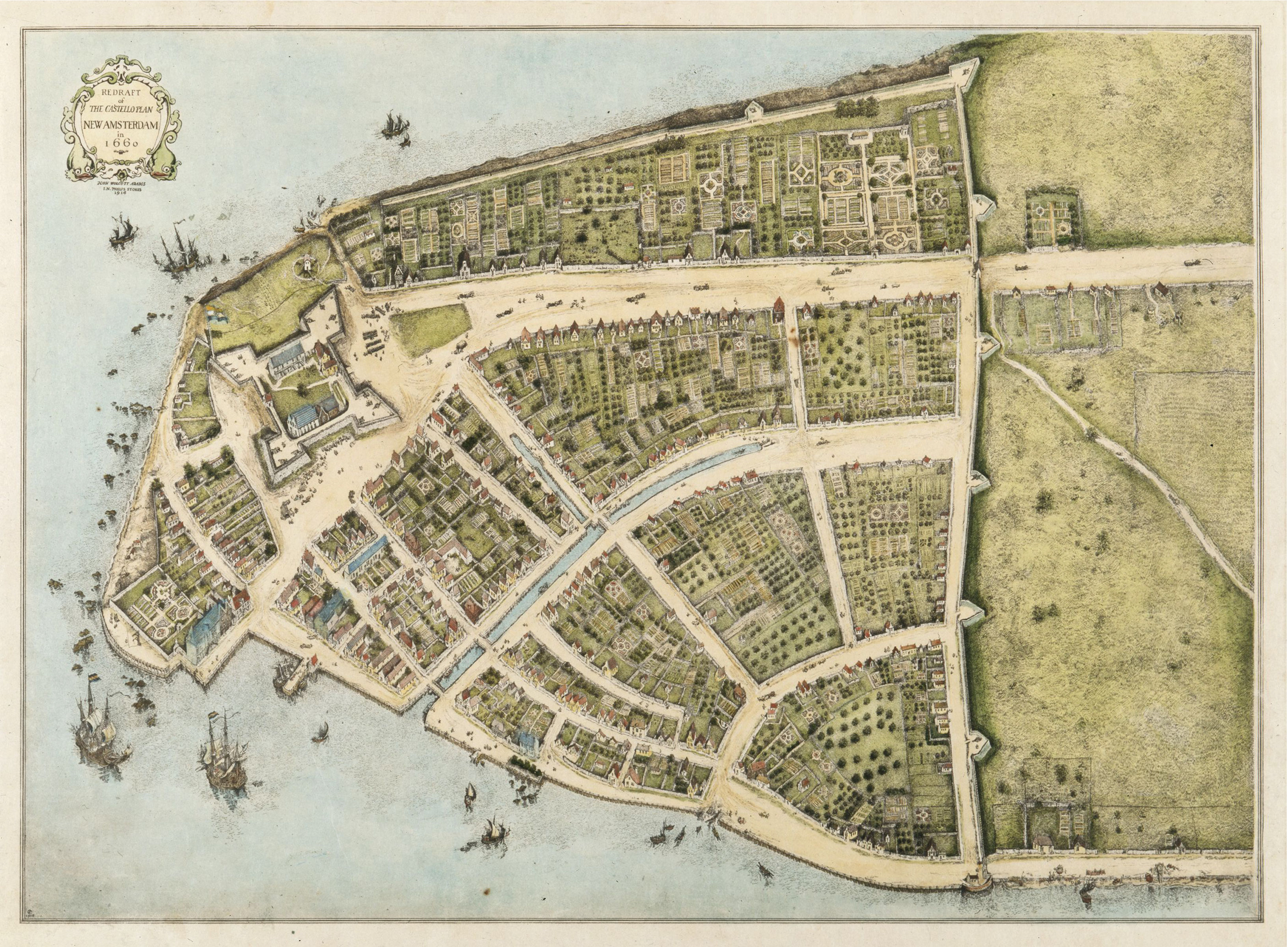
A 1660 map illustration of New Amsterdam, present-day Lower Manhattan

Henry Hudson's 1609 voyage marked the beginning of European involvement in the area. Sailing for the Dutch East India Company and looking for a passage to Asia, he entered the Upper New York Bay on September 11 of that year. Word of his findings encouraged Dutch merchants to explore the coast in search of profitable fur trading with local Native American tribes.

During the 17th century, the Dutch established trading posts in the colony of New Netherland to acquire pelts from the Lenape, Haudenosaunee, and other tribes in exchange for European goods. The first of these trading posts were Fort Nassau (1614, near present-day Albany); Fort Orange (1624, on the Hudson River just south of the current city of Albany and created to replace Fort Nassau), developing into settlement Beverwijck (1647), and into what became Albany; Fort Amsterdam (1625, to develop into the town New Amsterdam, which is present-day New York City); and Esopus (1653, now Kingston). The success of the patroonship of Rensselaerswyck (1630), which surrounded Albany and lasted until the mid-19th century, was also a key factor in the early success of the colony. The English captured the colony during the Second Anglo-Dutch War and governed it as the Province of New York. The city of New York was recaptured by the Dutch in 1673 during the Third Anglo-Dutch War (1672–1674) and renamed New Orange. It was returned to the English under the terms of the Treaty of Westminster a year later.

=== 18th century ===
==== French and Indian War ====
Upstate New York was a battleground between Britain and France during the Seven Years' War. Notable battles include the battles at Fort William Henry, the Battle of Lake George, and Fort Ticonderoga. At the outbreak of hostilities in 1754, representatives from the 13 colonies met in New York for the Albany Congress to discuss joint defense against the French. It was one of the first times the colonies debated joining together.

==== American Revolution ====
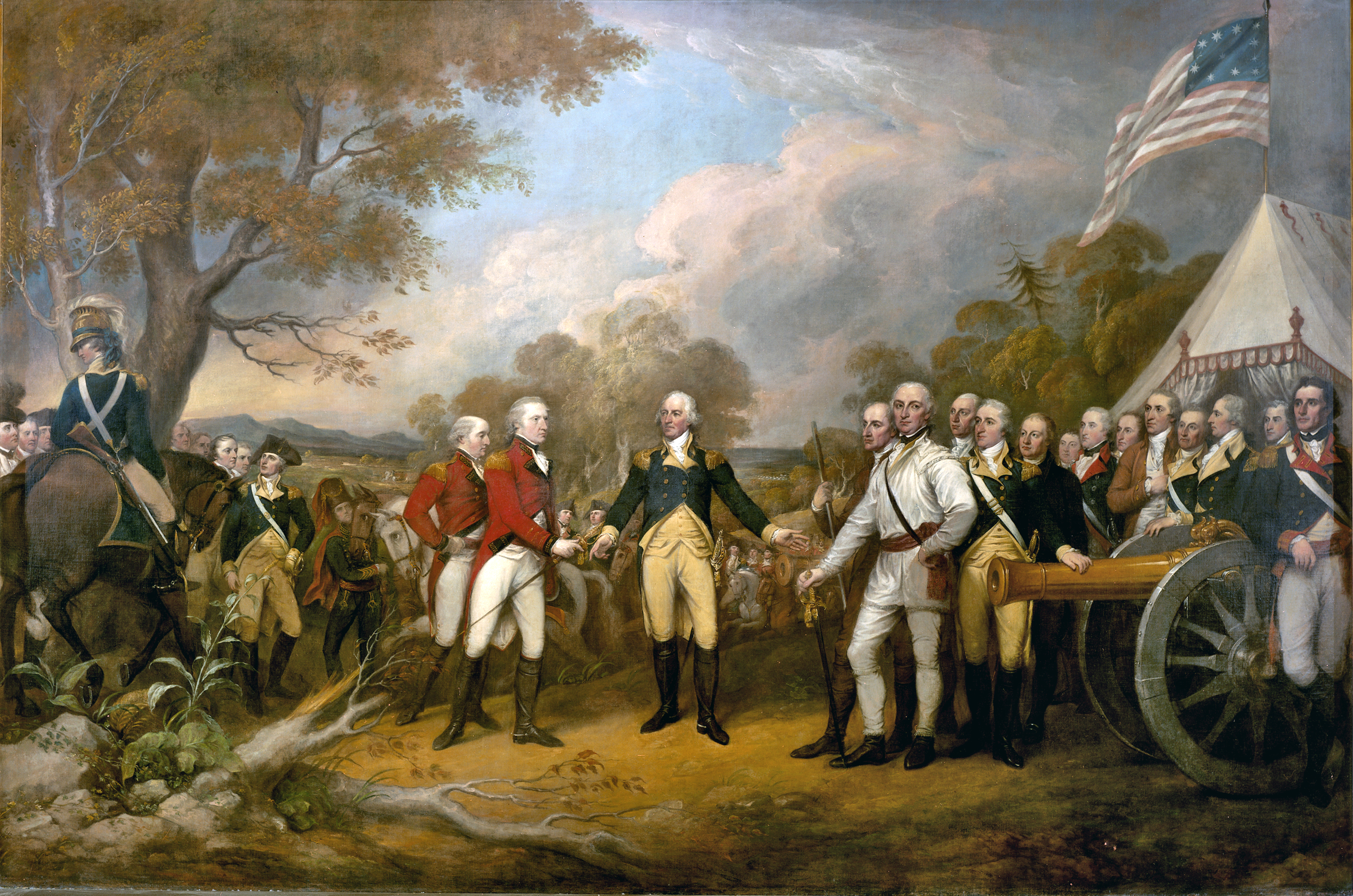
Illustration of British general John Burgoyne surrendering at Saratoga on October 17, 1777

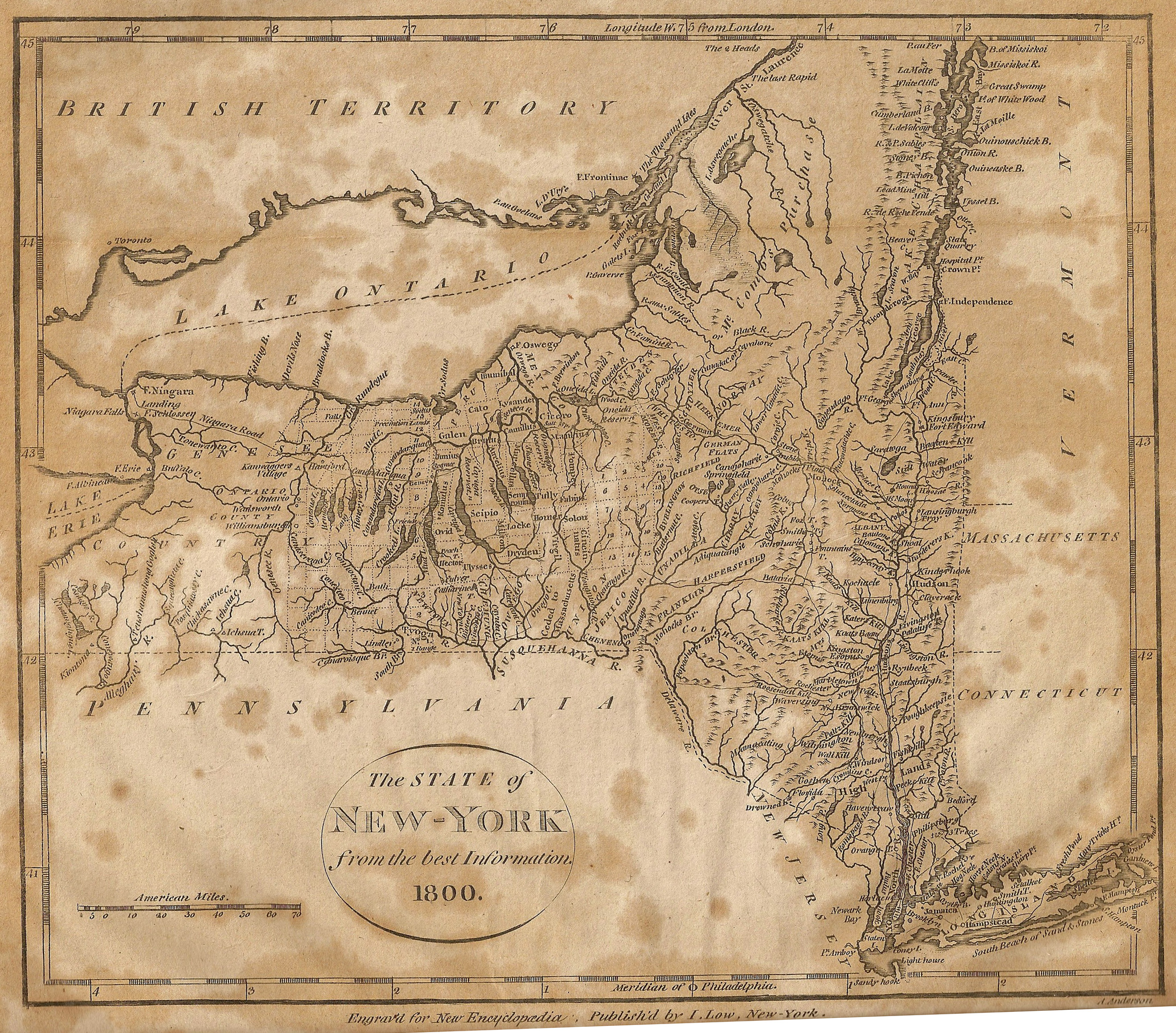
An 1800 map of New York from Low's Encyclopaedia

The Sons of Liberty were organized in New York City during the 1760s, largely in response to the Stamp Act passed by the British Parliament in 1765. The Stamp Act Congress met in the city on October 19, 1765, composed of representatives from across the Thirteen Colonies who set the stage for the Continental Congress to follow. The Stamp Act Congress resulted in the Declaration of Rights and Grievances, which was the first written expression by representatives of the Americans of many of the rights and complaints later expressed in the United States Declaration of Independence. This included the right to representative government. At the same time, given strong commercial, personal and sentimental links to Britain, many New York residents were Loyalists. The Capture of Fort Ticonderoga provided the cannon and gunpowder necessary to force a British withdrawal from the siege of Boston in 1775.

New York was the only colony not to vote for independence, as the delegates were not authorized to do so. New York then endorsed the Declaration of Independence on July 9, 1776. The New York State Constitution was framed by a convention which assembled at White Plains on July 10, 1776, and after repeated adjournments and changes of location, finished its work at Kingston on Sunday evening, April 20, 1777, when the new constitution drafted by John Jay was adopted with but one dissenting vote. It was not submitted to the people for ratification. On July 30, 1777, George Clinton was inaugurated as the first Governor of New York at Kingston.

Approximately a third of the battles of the American Revolutionary War took place in New York; the first major one and largest of the entire war was the Battle of Long Island, also known as the Battle of Brooklyn, in August 1776. After their victory, the British occupied present-day New York City, making it their military and political base of operations in North America for the duration of the conflict, and consequently the focus of General George Washington's intelligence network. On the notorious British prison ships of Wallabout Bay, more American combatants died than were killed in combat in every battle of the war combined. Both sides of combatants lost more soldiers to disease than to outright wounds. The first of two major British armies were captured by the Continental Army at the Battle of Saratoga in 1777, a success that influenced France to ally with the revolutionaries; the state constitution was enacted in 1777. New York became the 11th state to ratify the United States Constitution, on July 26, 1788.

In an attempt to retain their sovereignty and remain an independent nation positioned between the new United States and British North America, four of the Haudenosaunee Nations fought on the side of the British; only the Oneida and their dependents, the Tuscarora, allied themselves with the Americans. In retaliation for attacks on the frontier led by Joseph Brant and Loyalist Mohawk forces, the Sullivan Expedition of 1779 destroyed nearly 50 Haudenosaunee villages, adjacent croplands and winter stores, forcing many refugees to British-held Niagara.

As allies of the British, the Haudenosaunee were forced out of New York, although they had not been part of treaty negotiations. They resettled in Canada after the war and were given land grants by the Crown. In the treaty settlement, the British ceded most Indian lands to the new United States. Because New York made a treaty with the Haudenosaunee without getting Congressional approval, some of the land purchases have been subject to land claim suits since the late 20th century by the federally recognized tribes. New York put up more than 5 million acres (20,000 km^{2}) of former Haudenosaunee territory for sale in the years after the Revolutionary War, leading to rapid development in Upstate New York. As per the Treaty of Paris, the last vestige of British authority in the former Thirteen Colonies—their troops in New York City—departed in 1783, which was long afterward celebrated as Evacuation Day.

==== Confederation period and 1790s ====
New York City was the national capital under the Articles of Confederation and Perpetual Union, the first national government. That organization was found to be inadequate, and prominent New Yorker Alexander Hamilton advocated for a new government that would include an executive, national courts, and the power to tax. Hamilton led the Annapolis Convention (1786) that called for the Philadelphia Convention, which drafted the United States Constitution, in which he also took part. The new government was to be a strong federal national government to replace the relatively weaker confederation of individual states. Following heated debate, which included the publication of The Federalist Papers as a series of installments in New York City newspapers, New York was the 11th state to ratify the United States Constitution, on July 26, 1788.

New York City remained the national capital under the new constitution until 1790 when it was moved to Philadelphia until 1800, when it was relocated to its current location in Washington, D.C. and was the site of the inauguration of President George Washington, In the first session of the Supreme Court of the United States, the United States Bill of Rights were drafted.

=== 19th and 20th centuries ===
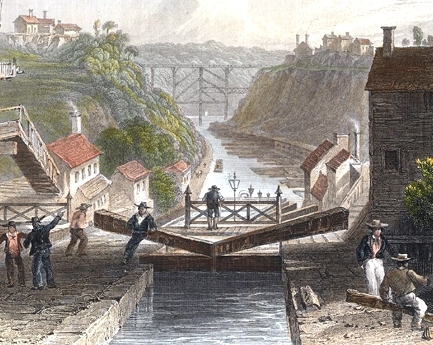
An illustration of the Erie Canal at Lockport in 1839

Transportation in Western New York was by expensive wagons on muddy roads before canals opened up the rich farmlands to long-distance traffic. Governor DeWitt Clinton promoted the Erie Canal, which connected New York City to the Great Lakes by the Hudson River, the new canal, and the rivers and lakes. Work commenced in 1817, and the Erie Canal opened eight years later, in 1825. Packet boats pulled by horses on tow paths traveled slowly over the canal carrying passengers and freight. Farm products came in from the Midwest, and finished manufactured goods moved west. It was an engineering marvel which opened up vast areas of New York to commerce and settlement. It enabled Great Lakes port cities such as Buffalo and Rochester to grow and prosper. It also connected the burgeoning agricultural production of the Midwest and shipping on the Great Lakes, with the port of New York City. Improving transportation, it enabled additional population migration to territories west of New York. After 1850, railroads largely replaced the canal.

The connectivity offered by the canal, and subsequently the railroads, led to an economic boom across the entire state through the 1950s. Major corporations that got their start in New York during this time include American Express, AT&T, Bristol Myers Squibb, Carrier, Chase, General Electric, Goldman Sachs, IBM, Kodak, Macy's, NBC, Pfizer, Random House, RCA, Tiffany & Co., Wells Fargo, Western Union, and Xerox.

New York City was a major ocean port and had extensive traffic importing cotton from the South and exporting manufacturing goods. Nearly half of the state's exports were related to cotton. Southern cotton factors, planters and bankers visited so often that they had favorite hotels. At the same time, activism for abolitionism was strong upstate, where some communities provided stops on the Underground Railroad. Upstate, and New York City, gave strong support for the American Civil War, in terms of finances, volunteer soldiers, and supplies. The state provided more than 370,000 soldiers to the Union armies. Over 53,000 New Yorkers died in service, roughly one of every seven who served. However, Irish draft riots in 1862 were a significant embarrassment.

==== Immigration ====
Scenes at the Immigration Depot and a nearby dock on Ellis Island in May 1906

Since the early 19th century, New York City has been the largest port of entry for legal immigration into the United States. In the United States, the federal government did not assume direct jurisdiction for immigration until 1890. Prior to this time, the matter was delegated to the individual states, then via contract between the states and the federal government. Most immigrants to New York would disembark at the bustling docks along the Hudson and East Rivers, in the eventual Lower Manhattan. On May 4, 1847, the New York State Legislature created the Board of Commissioners of Immigration to regulate immigration.

The first permanent immigration depot in New York was established in 1855 at Castle Garden, a converted War of 1812 era fort located within what is now Battery Park, at the tip of Lower Manhattan. The first immigrants to arrive at the new depot were aboard three ships that had just been released from quarantine. Castle Garden served as New York's immigrant depot until it closed on April 18, 1890, when the federal government assumed control over immigration. During that period, more than eight million immigrants passed through its doors (two of every three U.S. immigrants).

When the federal government assumed control, it established the Bureau of Immigration, which chose the three-acre (1.2 ha) Ellis Island in Upper New York Harbor for an entry depot. Already federally controlled, the island had served as an ammunition depot. It was chosen due its relative isolation with proximity to New York City and the rail lines of Jersey City, New Jersey, via a short ferry ride. While the island was being developed and expanded via land reclamation, the federal government operated a temporary depot at the Barge Office at the Battery.

Ellis Island opened on January 1, 1892, and operated as a central immigration center until the National Origins Act was passed in 1924, reducing immigration. After that date, the only immigrants to pass through were displaced persons or war refugees. The island ceased all immigration processing on November 12, 1954, when the last person detained on the island, Norwegian seaman Arne Peterssen, was released. He had overstayed his shore leave and left on the 10:15 a.m. Manhattan-bound ferry to return to his ship.

More than 12 million immigrants passed through Ellis Island between 1892 and 1954. More than 100 million Americans across the United States can trace their ancestry to these immigrants. Ellis Island was the subject of a contentious and long-running border and jurisdictional dispute between the State of New York and the State of New Jersey, as both claimed it. The issue was officially settled in 1998 by the U.S. Supreme Court which ruled that the original 3.3-acre (1.3 ha) island was New York state territory and that the balance of the 27.5 acres (11 ha) added after 1834 by landfill was in New Jersey. In May 1964, Ellis Island was added to the National Park Service by President Lyndon B. Johnson and is still owned by the federal government as part of the Statue of Liberty National Monument. In 1990, Ellis Island was opened to the public as a museum of immigration.

=== 21st century ===
==== September 11 attacks ====
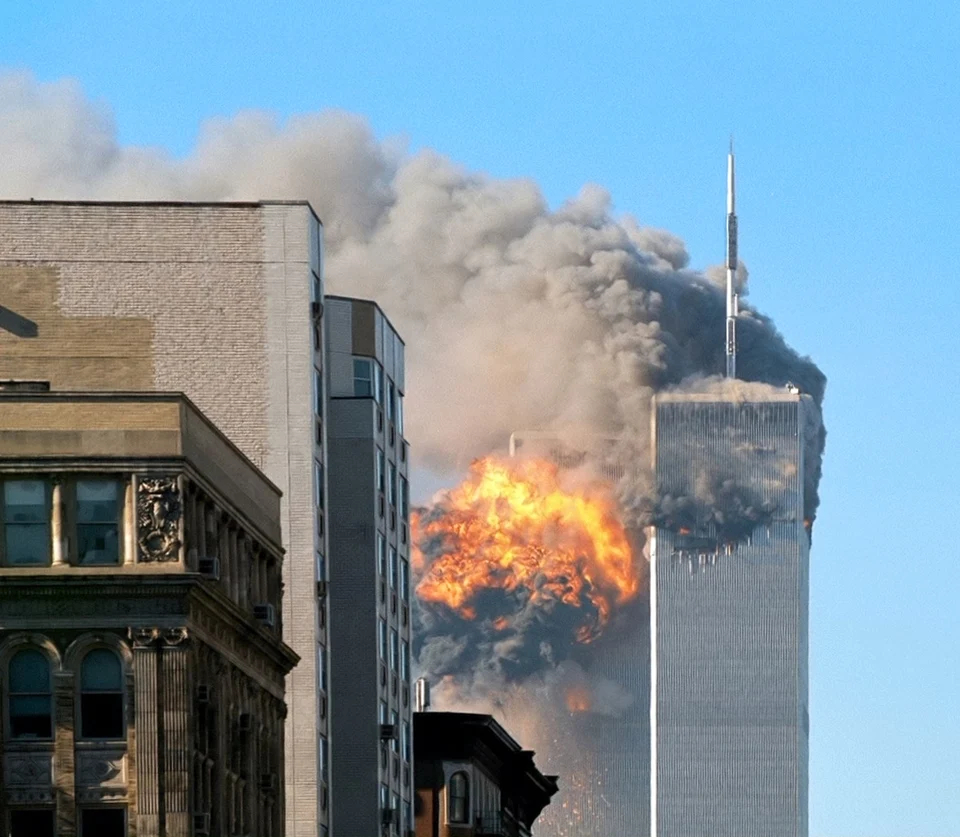
United Airlines Flight 175 hitting the South Tower during the September 11 attacks

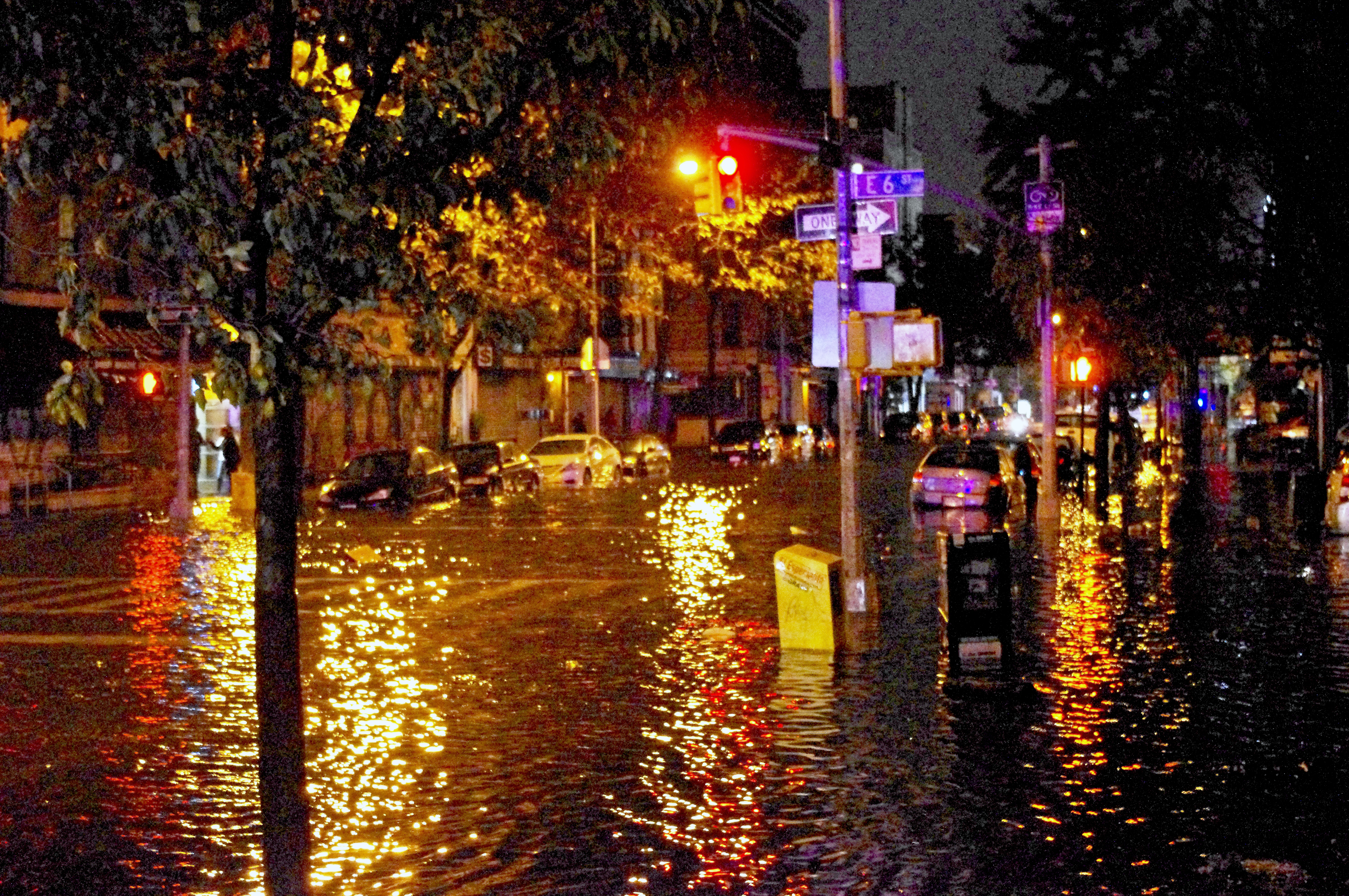
Flooding on Avenue C in Lower Manhattan caused by Hurricane Sandy in October 2012

On September 11, 2001, two of four hijacked planes were flown into the Twin Towers of the original World Trade Center in Lower Manhattan, and the towers collapsed. 7 World Trade Center also collapsed due to damage from fires. The other buildings of the World Trade Center complex were damaged beyond repair and demolished soon thereafter. The collapse of the Twin Towers caused extensive damage and resulted in the deaths of 2,753 victims, including 147 aboard the two planes. Since September 11, most of Lower Manhattan has been restored. In the years since, over 7,000 rescue workers and residents of the area have developed several life-threatening illnesses, and some have died.

A memorial at the site, the National September 11 Memorial & Museum, was opened to the public on September 11, 2011. A permanent museum later opened at the site on March 21, 2014. Upon its completion in 2014, the new One World Trade Center became the tallest skyscraper in the Western Hemisphere, at 1,776 feet (541 m), meant to symbolize the year America gained its independence, 1776. From 2006 to 2023, 3 World Trade Center, 4 World Trade Center, 7 World Trade Center, the World Trade Center Transportation Hub, Liberty Park, Fiterman Hall, St. Nicholas Greek Orthodox Church, and the Ronald O. Perelman Performing Arts Center were also constructed on the World Trade Center site.

==== Hurricane Sandy (2012) ====
On October 29 and 30, 2012, Hurricane Sandy caused extensive destruction of the state's shorelines, ravaging portions of New York City, Long Island, and southern Westchester with record-high storm surge, with severe flooding and high winds causing power outages for hundreds of thousands of New Yorkers, and leading to gasoline shortages and disruption of mass transit systems. The storm and its profound effects have prompted the discussion of constructing seawalls and other coastal barriers around the shorelines of New York City and Long Island to minimize the risk from another such future event. Such risk is considered highly probable due to global warming and rising sea levels.

==== COVID-19 pandemic (2020–2023) ====
On March 1, 2020, New York had its first confirmed case of COVID-19 after Washington (state), two months prior.

From May 19–20, Western New York and the Capital Region entered Phase 1 of reopening. On May 26, the Hudson Valley began Phase 1, and New York City partially reopened on June 8.

During July 2020, a federal judge ruled Governor Andrew Cuomo and Mayor Bill de Blasio exceeded authority by limiting religious gatherings to 25% when others operated at 50% capacity. On Thanksgiving Eve, the U.S. Supreme Court blocked additional religious restrictions imposed by Cuomo for areas with high infection rates.

== Geography ==
New York is bordered by five U.S. states (Connecticut, Massachusetts, New Jersey, Pennsylvania, and Vermont), two Great Lakes (Lake Erie and Lake Ontario), and two Canadian provinces (Ontario and Quebec).

The state of New York covers a total area of 54,555 square miles (141,297 km^{2}) and ranks as the 27th-largest state by size. The highest elevation in New York is Mount Marcy in the Adirondack High Peaks in Northern New York, at 5,344 feet (1,629 meters) above sea level; while the state's lowest point is at sea level, on the Atlantic Ocean in Downstate New York.

In contrast with New York City's urban landscape, the vast majority of the state's geographic area is dominated by meadows, forests, rivers, farms, mountains, and lakes. Most of the southern part of the state rests on the Allegheny Plateau, which extends from the southeastern United States to the Catskill Mountains; the section in the State of New York is known as the Southern Tier. The rugged Adirondack Mountains, with vast tracts of wilderness, lie west of the Lake Champlain Valley. Lake George, known as the Queen of the Lakes in the United States, drains through the La Chute River into Lake Champlain at the eastern edge of the Adirondacks. The Great Appalachian Valley dominates eastern New York and contains Lake Champlain Valley as its northern half and the Hudson Valley as its southern half within the state. The Tug Hill region arises as a cuesta east of Lake Ontario. The state of New York contains a part of the Marcellus shale, which extends into Ohio and Pennsylvania.

Upstate and Downstate are often used informally to distinguish New York City or its greater metropolitan area from the rest of the State of New York. The placement of a boundary between the two is a matter of great contention. Unofficial and loosely defined regions of Upstate New York include from the Southern Tier, which includes many of the counties along the border with Pennsylvania, to the North Country region, above or sometimes including parts of the Adirondack region.

=== Water ===
==== Borders ====
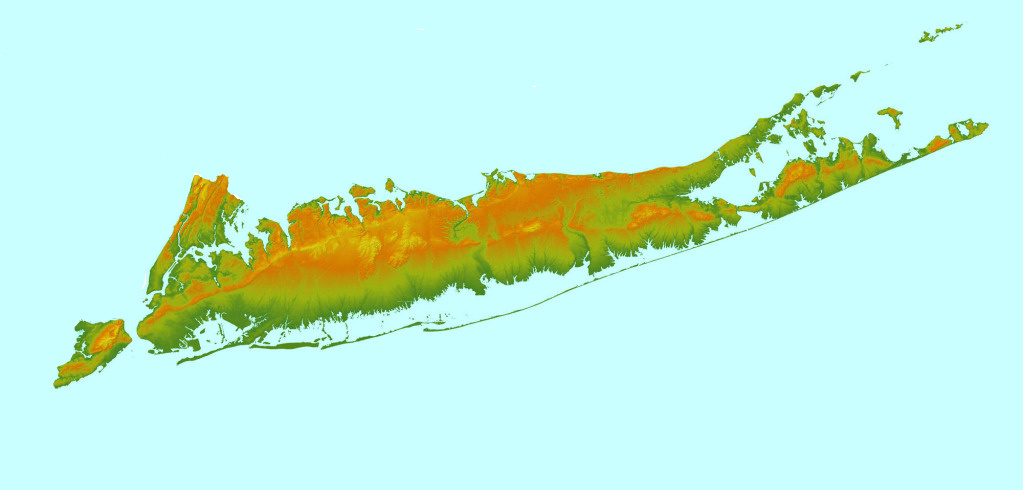
Enveloped by the Atlantic Ocean and Long Island Sound, New York City and Long Island have a combined population of 11 million residents, representing over 56 percent of the state's population.

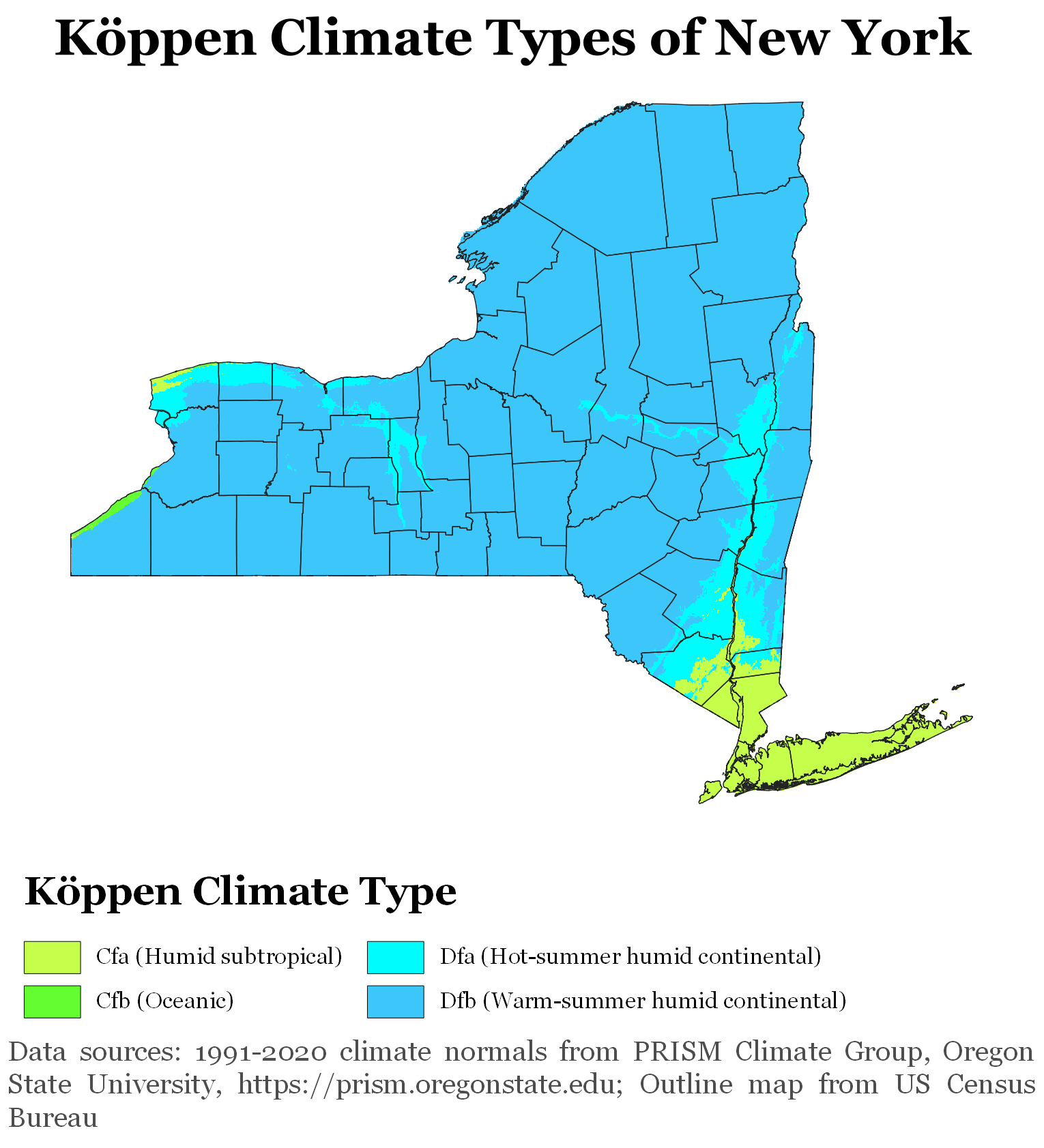
The Köppen climate classification of New York

Lake-effect snow is a major contributor to heavy snowfall totals in Western New York, including the Tug Hill region.

Among the total area of New York state, 13.6% consists of water. Much of New York's boundaries are in water, as is true for New York City: four of its five boroughs are situated on three islands at the mouth of the Hudson River: Manhattan Island; Staten Island; and Long Island, which contains Brooklyn and Queens at its western end. The state's borders include a water boundary in (clockwise from the west) two Great Lakes (Lake Erie and Lake Ontario, which are connected by the Niagara River); the provinces of Ontario and Quebec in Canada, with New York and Ontario sharing the Thousand Islands archipelago within the Saint Lawrence River, while most of its border with Quebec is on land; it shares Lake Champlain with the New England state of Vermont; the New England state of Massachusetts has mostly a land border; New York extends into Long Island Sound and the Atlantic Ocean, sharing a water border with Rhode Island, while Connecticut has land and sea borders. Except for areas near the New York Harbor and the Upper Delaware River, New York has a mostly land border with two Mid-Atlantic states, New Jersey and Pennsylvania. New York is the only state that borders both the Great Lakes and the Atlantic Ocean.

==== Drainage ====
The Hudson River begins near Lake Tear of the Clouds and flows south through the eastern part of the state, without draining Lakes George or Champlain. Lake George empties at its north end into Lake Champlain, whose northern end extends into Canada, where it drains into the Richelieu River and then ultimately the Saint Lawrence River. The western section of the state is drained by the Allegheny River and rivers of the Susquehanna and Delaware River systems. Niagara Falls is shared between New York and Ontario as it flows on the Niagara River from Lake Erie to Lake Ontario. The Delaware River Basin Compact, signed in 1961 by New York, New Jersey, Pennsylvania, Delaware, and the federal government, regulates the utilization of water of the Delaware system.

=== Climate ===
Under the Köppen climate classification, most of New York has a humid continental climate, though New York City and Long Island have a humid subtropical climate. Weather in New York is heavily influenced by two continental air masses: a warm, humid one from the southwest and a cold, dry one from the northwest. Downstate New York (comprising New York City, Long Island, and lower portions of the Hudson Valley) have rather hot summers with some periods of high humidity and cold, damp winters which are relatively mild compared to temperatures in Upstate New York, due to the downstate region's lower elevation, proximity to the Atlantic Ocean, and relatively lower latitude.

Upstate New York experiences warm summers, marred by only occasional, brief intervals of sultry conditions, with long and cold winters. Western New York, particularly the Tug Hill region, receives heavy lake-effect snows, especially during the earlier portions of winter, before the surface of Lake Ontario itself is covered by ice. The summer climate is cool in the Adirondacks, Catskills, and at higher elevations of the Southern Tier. Buffalo and its metropolitan area are described as climate change havens for their weather pattern in Western New York.

Summer daytime temperatures range from the high 70s to low 80s °F (25 to 28 °C), over most of the state. In the majority of winter seasons, a temperature of −13 °F (−25 °C) or lower can be expected in the northern highlands (Northern Plateau) and 5 °F (−15 °C) or colder in the southwestern and east-central highlands of the Southern Tier. New York had a record-high temperature of 108 °F (42.2 °C) on July 22, 1926, in the Albany area. Its record-lowest temperature during the winter was −52 °F (−46.7 °C) in 1979. Governors Island, Manhattan, in New York Harbor, is planned to host a US$1 billion research and education center poised to make New York the global leader in addressing the climate crisis.

=== Flora and fauna ===
Due to New York's relatively large land area and unique geography compared to other eastern states, there are several distinct ecoregions present in the state, many of them reduced heavily due to urbanization and other human activities: Southern Great Lakes forests in Western New York, New England–Acadian forests on the New England border, Northeastern coastal forests in the lower Hudson Valley and western Long Island, Atlantic coastal pine barrens in southern Long Island, Northeastern interior dry–mesic oak forest in the eastern Southern Tier and upper Hudson Valley, Appalachian–Blue Ridge forests in the Hudson Valley), Central Appalachian dry oak–pine forest around the Hudson Valley, Eastern Great Lakes and Hudson Lowlands, Eastern forest–boreal transition in the Adirondacks, Eastern Great Lakes lowland forests around the Adirondacks, and Allegheny Highlands forests, most of which are in the western Southern Tier.

Some species that can be found in this state are American ginseng, starry stonewort, waterthyme, water chestnut, eastern poison ivy, poison sumac, giant hogweed, cow parsnip and common nettle. There are more than 70 mammal species, more than 20 bird species, some species of amphibians, and several reptile species.

Species of mammals that are found in New York are the white-footed mouse, North American least shrew, little brown bat, muskrat, eastern gray squirrel, eastern cottontail, American ermine, groundhog, striped skunk, fisher, North American river otter, raccoon, bobcat, eastern coyote, red fox, gray fox white-tailed deer, moose, and American black bear; extirpated mammals include Canada lynx, American bison, wolverine, Allegheny woodrat, caribou, eastern elk, eastern cougar, and eastern wolf. Some species of birds in New York are the ring-necked pheasant, northern bobwhite, ruffed grouse, spruce grouse, Canada jay, wild turkey, blue jay, eastern bluebird (the state bird), American robin, and black-capped chickadee.

Birds of prey that are present in the state are great horned owls, bald eagles, red-tailed hawks, American kestrels, and northern harriers. Waterfowl like mallards, wood ducks, canvasbacks, American black ducks, trumpeter swans, Canada geese, and blue-winged teals can be found in the region. Maritime or shore birds of New York are great blue heron, killdeers, northern cardinals, American herring gulls, and common terns. Reptile and amphibian species in land areas of New York include queen snakes, hellbenders, diamondback terrapins, timber rattlesnakes, eastern fence lizards, spotted turtles, and Blanding's turtles. Sea turtles that can be found in the state are the green sea turtle, loggerhead sea turtle, leatherback sea turtle and Kemp's ridley sea turtle. New York Harbor and the Hudson River constitute an estuary, making the state of New York home to a rich array of marine life including shellfish—such as oysters and clams—as well as fish, microorganisms, and sea-birds.

Economic regions

Tourism regions

=== Regions ===
Due to its long history, New York has several overlapping and often conflicting definitions of regions within the state. The regions are also not fully definable due to the colloquial use of regional labels. The New York State Department of Economic Development provides two distinct definitions of these regions. It divides the state's counties into ten economic regions, which approximately correspond to terminology used by residents:

1. Western New York
2. Finger Lakes
3. Southern Tier
4. Central New York
5. North Country
6. Mohawk Valley
7. Capital District
8. Hudson Valley
9. New York City
10. Long Island

The department also groups the counties into eleven regions for tourism purposes.

1. Chautauqua–Allegheny
2. Niagara Frontier
3. Finger Lakes
4. Thousand Islands
5. Central-Leatherstocking Region
6. Adirondack Mountains
7. Capital District
8. Catskill Mountains
9. Hudson Valley
10. New York City
11. Long Island

=== State parks ===
Two major New York state parks (in green), Adirondack Park (north) and Catskill Park (south)

New York has many state parks and two major forest preserves. Niagara Falls State Park, established in 1885, is the oldest state park in the United States and the first to be created via eminent domain. In 1892, Adirondack Park, roughly the size of the state of Vermont and the largest state park in the United States, was established and given state constitutional protection to remain "forever wild" in 1894. The park is larger than Yellowstone, Everglades, Glacier, and Grand Canyon national parks combined. The Catskill Park was protected in legislation passed in 1885, which declared that its land was to be conserved and never put up for sale or lease. Consisting of 700,000 acres (2,800 km^{2}; 280,000 ha) of land, the park is a habitat for deer, minks, and fishers. There are some 400 black bears living in the region. The state operates numerous campgrounds, and there are over 300 miles (480 km) of multi-use trails in the Park.

The 1797 Montauk Lighthouse, commissioned under President George Washington, is a major tourist attraction in Montauk Point State Park at the easternmost tip of Long Island. Hither Hills State Park, also on Long Island's South Fork, offers camping and is a popular destination with surfcasting sport fishermen.

=== National parks, monuments, and historic landmarks ===
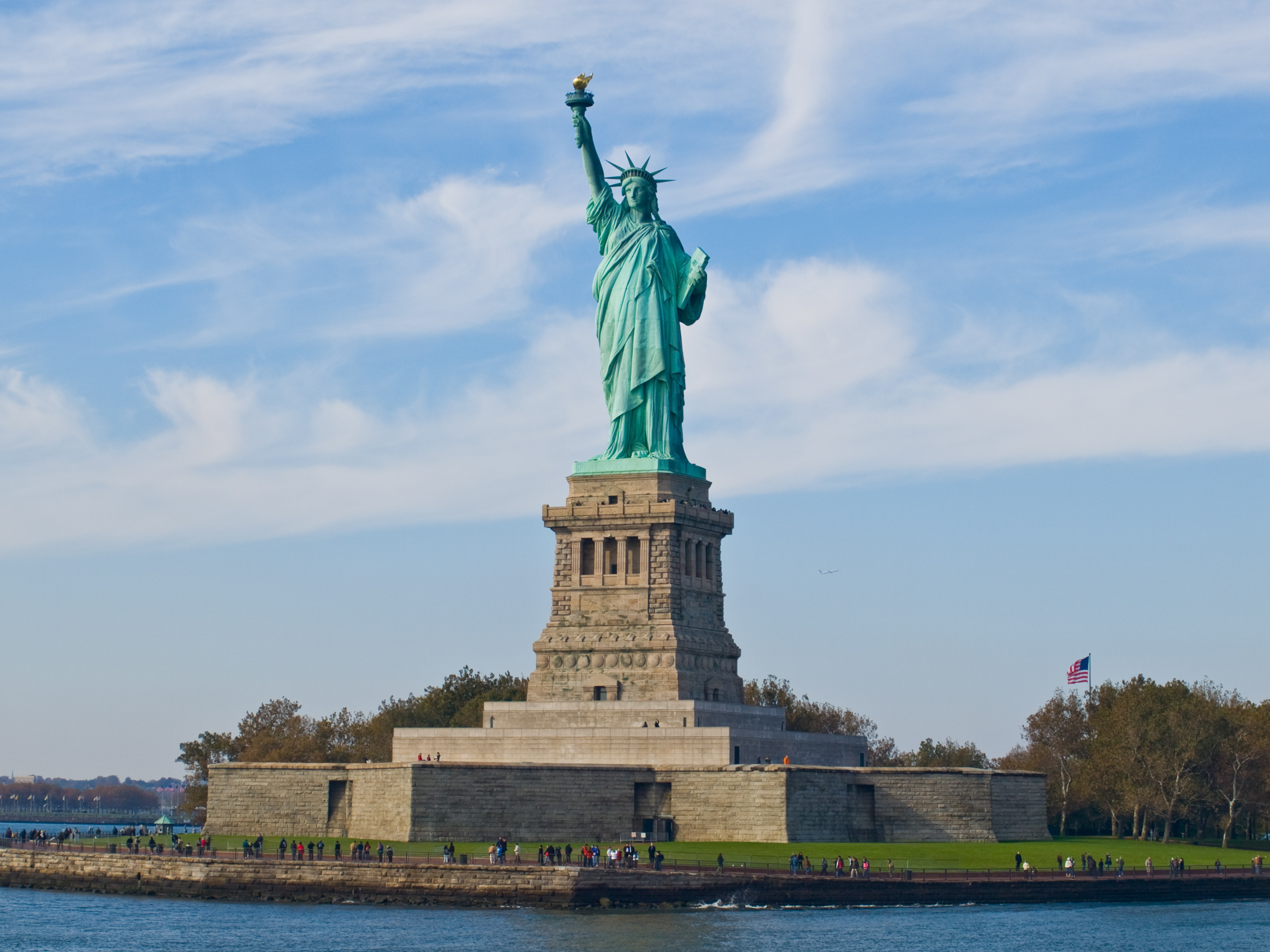
The Statue of Liberty in New York Harbor, a global symbol of the United States and its ideals

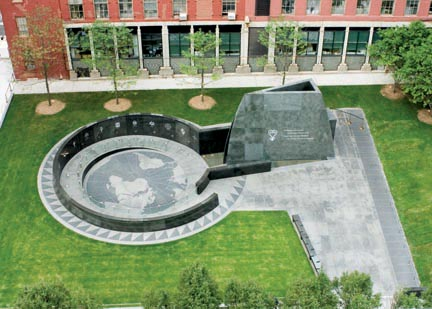
The African Burial Ground National Monument in Lower Manhattan

The State of New York is well represented in the National Park System with 22 national parks, which received 16,349,381 visitors in 2011. In addition, there are a national marine sanctuary, four national heritage areas, 27 national natural landmarks, 262 national historic landmarks, and over 6,000 listings on the National Register of Historic Places. Some major areas, landmarks, and monuments are listed below.

- The Statue of Liberty National Monument includes Ellis Island and the Statue of Liberty. The statue, designed by Frédéric Bartholdi and formally named Liberty Enlightening the World, was a gift from France to the United States to mark the Centennial of the American Declaration of Independence; it was dedicated in New York Harbor on October 28, 1886. It has since become an icon of the United States and the concepts of democracy and freedom.
- The African Burial Ground National Monument in Lower Manhattan is the only national monument dedicated to Americans of African ancestry. It preserves a site containing the remains of more than 400 Africans buried during the late 17th and 18th centuries in a portion of what was the largest colonial-era cemetery for people of African descent, both free and enslaved, with an estimated tens of thousands of remains interred. The site's excavation and study were called "the most important historic urban archeological project in the United States."
- Fire Island National Seashore is a United States national seashore that protects a 26-mile (42 km) section of Fire Island, an approximately 30-mile (48 km) long barrier island separated from the mainland of Long Island by the Great South Bay. The island is part of Suffolk County.
- Gateway National Recreation Area is more than 26,000 acres (10,522 ha) of water, salt marsh, wetlands, islands, and shoreline at the entrance to New York Harbor, the majority of which lies within New York. Including areas on Long Island and in New Jersey, it covers more area than that of two Manhattan islands.
- General Grant National Memorial is the final resting place of President Ulysses S. Grant and is the largest mausoleum in North America.
- Hamilton Grange National Memorial preserves the home of Alexander Hamilton, Caribbean immigrant and orphan who rose to be a United States founding father and associate of George Washington.
- The Home of Franklin D. Roosevelt National Historic Site, established in 1945, preserves the Springwood estate in Hyde Park, New York. Springwood was the birthplace, lifelong home, and burial place of the 32nd President of the United States, Franklin D. Roosevelt.
- The Lake Ontario National Marine Sanctuary was designated by the National Oceanic and Atmospheric Administration in 2024; it covers 1,722 square miles (1,300 sq nmi; 4,460 km^{2}) of southeastern Lake Ontario off the coasts of Jefferson, Oswego, Cayuga, and Wayne counties and protects historic shipwrecks and an area of cultural, historical, and spiritual importance to Native Americans. It is managed jointly by NOAA's Office of National Marine Sanctuaries and the State of New York.
- Niagara Falls National Heritage Area was designated by the U.S. Congress in 2008; it stretches from the western boundary of Wheatfield, New York to the mouth of the Niagara River on Lake Ontario, including the communities of Niagara Falls, Youngstown, and Lewiston. It includes Niagara Falls State Park and Colonial Niagara Historic District. It is managed in collaboration with the state.
- Saratoga National Historical Park preserves the site of the Battles of Saratoga, the first significant American military victory of the American Revolutionary War. In 1777, American forces defeated a major British Army, which led France to recognize the independence of the United States, and enter the war as a decisive military ally of the struggling Americans.
- Stonewall National Monument, in the Greenwich Village neighborhood of Lower Manhattan, is the first U.S. national monument dedicated to LGBTQ rights, designated on June 24, 2016. The monument comprises the area around the still privately operated Stonewall Inn, commonly recognized to be the cradle of the gay liberation movement as the site of the 1969 Stonewall Riots; the adjacent Christopher Park; and surrounding streets and sidewalks.
- Manhattan's Theodore Roosevelt Birthplace National Historic Site is also the childhood home of President Theodore Roosevelt, the only president born in New York City until Donald Trump.

=== Administrative divisions ===
New York counties, municipalities, and towns

As of 2022, New York is divided into 62 counties. Aside from the five counties of New York City, each of these counties is subdivided into towns and cities, incorporated under state law. Towns can contain incorporated villages or unincorporated hamlets. New York City is divided into five boroughs, each coterminous with a county. The major cities of the state developed along the key transportation and trade routes of the early 19th century, including the Erie Canal and railroads paralleling it. The New York Thruway acts as a modern counterpart to commercial water routes. Downstate New York (New York City, Long Island, and the southern portion of the Hudson Valley) can be considered to form the central core of the Northeast megalopolis, an urbanized region stretching from New Hampshire to Virginia.

==== Cities and towns ====
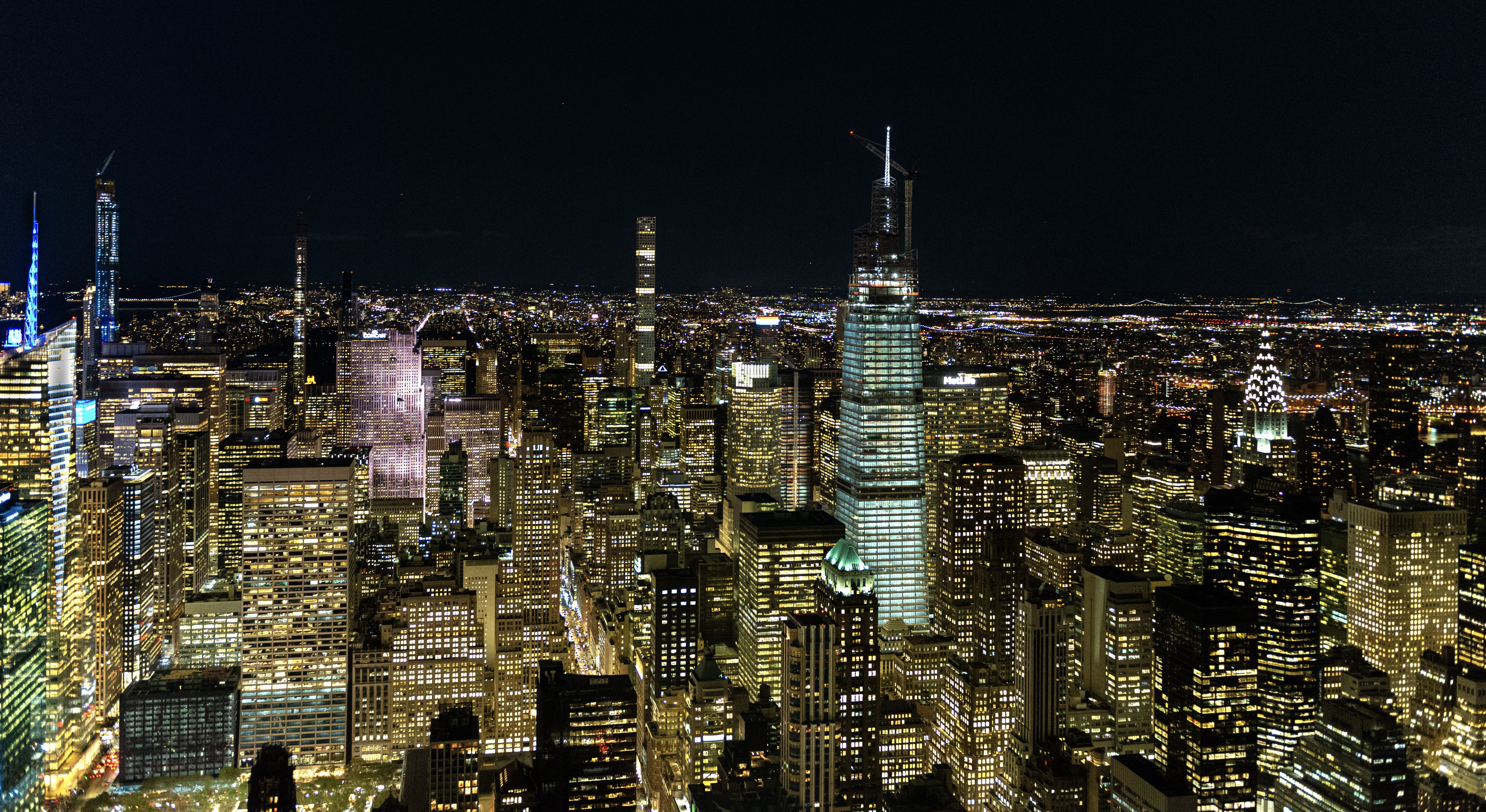
New York City at night

New York contains 62 administrative divisions termed cities. The largest city in the state and the most populous city in the United States is New York City, which comprises five counties (each coextensive with a borough): Bronx, New York County (Manhattan), Queens, Kings County (Brooklyn), and Richmond County (Staten Island). New York City is home to more than two-fifths of the state's population. Albany, the state capital, is the sixth-largest city in the State of New York. The smallest city is Sherrill, New York, in Oneida County. Hempstead is the most populous town in the state; if it were a city, it would be the second-largest in the State of New York, with more than 700,000 residents. New York contains 13 metropolitan areas, as defined by the U.S. Census Bureau. Major metro areas include New York City, Buffalo, Rochester, the Capital District (Albany, Schenectady, and Troy), Poughkeepsie, Syracuse, Utica, and Binghamton.

Largest cities or towns in New York 2020 U.S. census
Rank	Name	County	Pop.
1	New York City	Kings, Queens, New York, Bronx, Richmond	8,804,190
2	Hempstead	Nassau	793,409
3	Brookhaven	Suffolk	488,497
4	Islip	Suffolk	339,938
5	Oyster Bay	Nassau	301,332
6	Buffalo	Erie	278,349
7	North Hempstead	Nassau	237,639
8	Babylon	Suffolk	218,223
9	Yonkers	Westchester	211,569
10	Rochester	Monroe	211,328

== Demographics ==
=== Population ===
Historical population
Census	Pop.	Note	%±
1790	340,120		—
1800	589,051		73.2%
1810	959,049		62.8%
1820	1,372,812		43.1%
1830	1,918,608		39.8%
1840	2,428,921		26.6%
1850	3,097,394		27.5%
1860	3,880,735		25.3%
1870	4,382,759		12.9%
1880	5,082,871		16.0%
1890	6,003,174		18.1%
1900	7,268,894		21.1%
1910	9,113,614		25.4%
1920	10,385,227		14.0%
1930	12,588,066		21.2%
1940	13,479,142		7.1%
1950	14,830,192		10.0%
1960	16,782,304		13.2%
1970	18,236,967		8.7%
1980	17,558,072		−3.7%
1990	17,990,455		2.5%
2000	18,976,457		5.5%
2010	19,378,102		2.1%
2020	20,201,249		4.2%
2025 (est.)	20,002,427		−1.0%
Sources: 1910–2020. 2024.

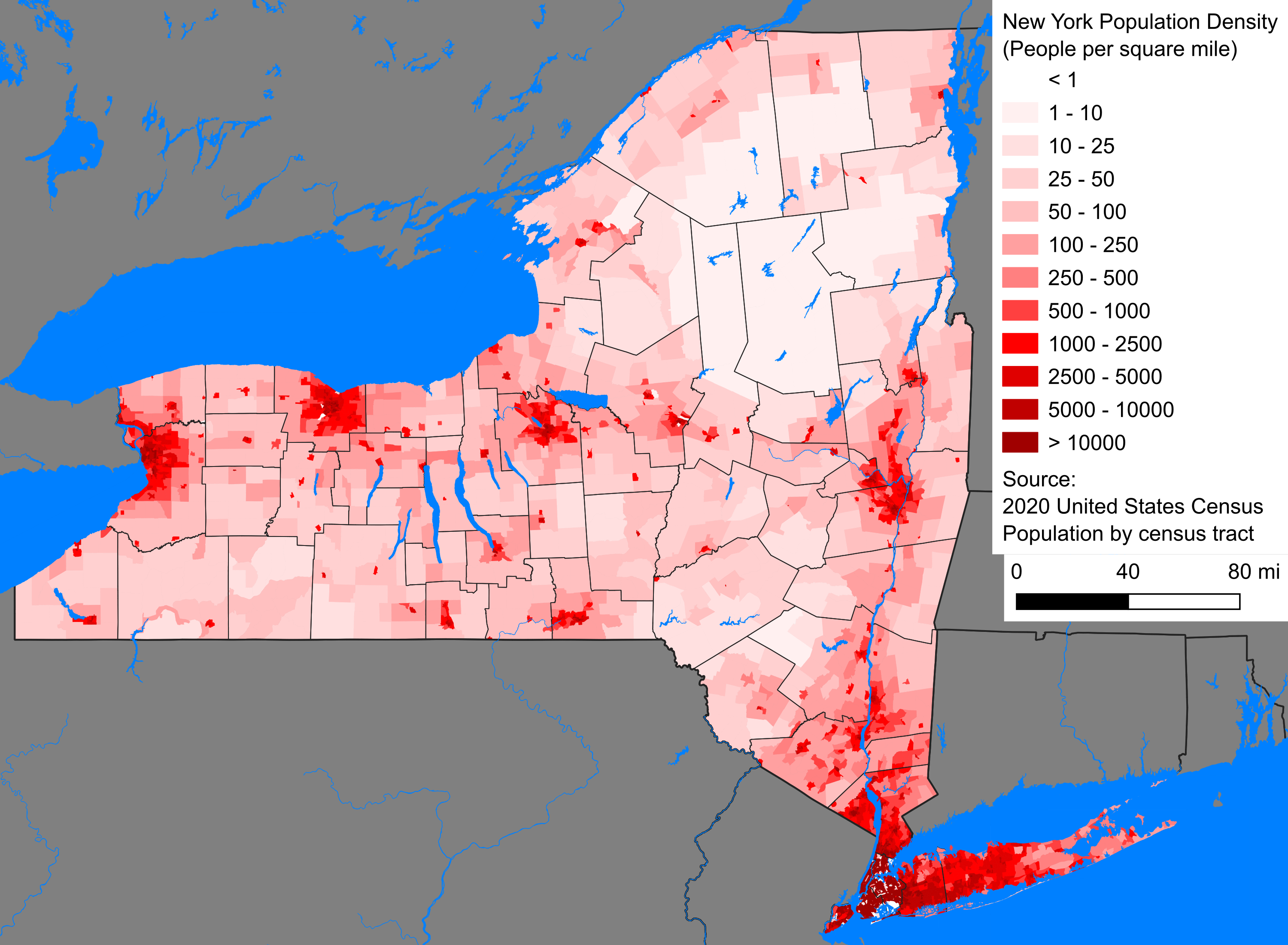
Among New York state's population of 19.5 million, 11 million, or 56 percent, are in New York City or Long Island

New York was the most populous state in the U.S. from the 1810s until 1962. As of 2024, it is the nation's fourth-most populous state behind California, Texas, and Florida. Growth has been distributed unevenly. The New York metropolitan area and the Capital District (particularly Saratoga County) have been growing robustly overall, while the Buffalo–Niagara Falls metropolitan area, Rochester, Syracuse, and other population centers have been losing residents or have been stagnant for decades before resuming growth more recently. New York City gained 223,615 residents between April 2010 and July 2018, representing the greatest population increase of any U.S. city.

According to immigration statistics, the state is a leading recipient of migrants from around the globe. In 2008 New York had the second-largest international immigrant population in the country among U.S. states, at 4.2 million; most reside in and around New York City, due to its size, high profile, vibrant economy, and cosmopolitan culture. New York has a sanctuary city law.

The United States Census Bureau tabulated in the 2020 census that the population of New York was 20,215,751 on April 1, 2020, a 4.3% increase since the 2010 census. Despite the abundance of open land in the state, New York's population is very urban, with 92% of residents living in an urban area, predominantly in the New York City metropolitan area.

Two-thirds of the state's population resides in the New York metropolitan area. New York City, with approximately 44% of the state's population, is the most populous city in the United States, with an estimated record high population of 8,622,698 in 2017, incorporating more immigration into the city than emigration since the 2010 United States census. More than twice as many people live in New York City as in the second-most populous U.S. city, Los Angeles, and within a smaller area. Long Island alone accounted for a census-estimated 7,838,722 residents in 2015, representing nearly 40% of the State of New York's population. Of the total statewide population, 6.5% of New Yorkers were under five years of age, 24.7% under 18, and 12.9% were 65 or older.

According to HUD's 2022 Annual Homeless Assessment Report, there were an estimated 74,178 homeless people in New York.

In 2017, the leading out-of-state birthplaces for New York residents were the Dominican Republic, China, India, Puerto Rico, New Jersey, Pennsylvania, Russia, Mexico, and Central American countries.

=== Race and ethnicity ===
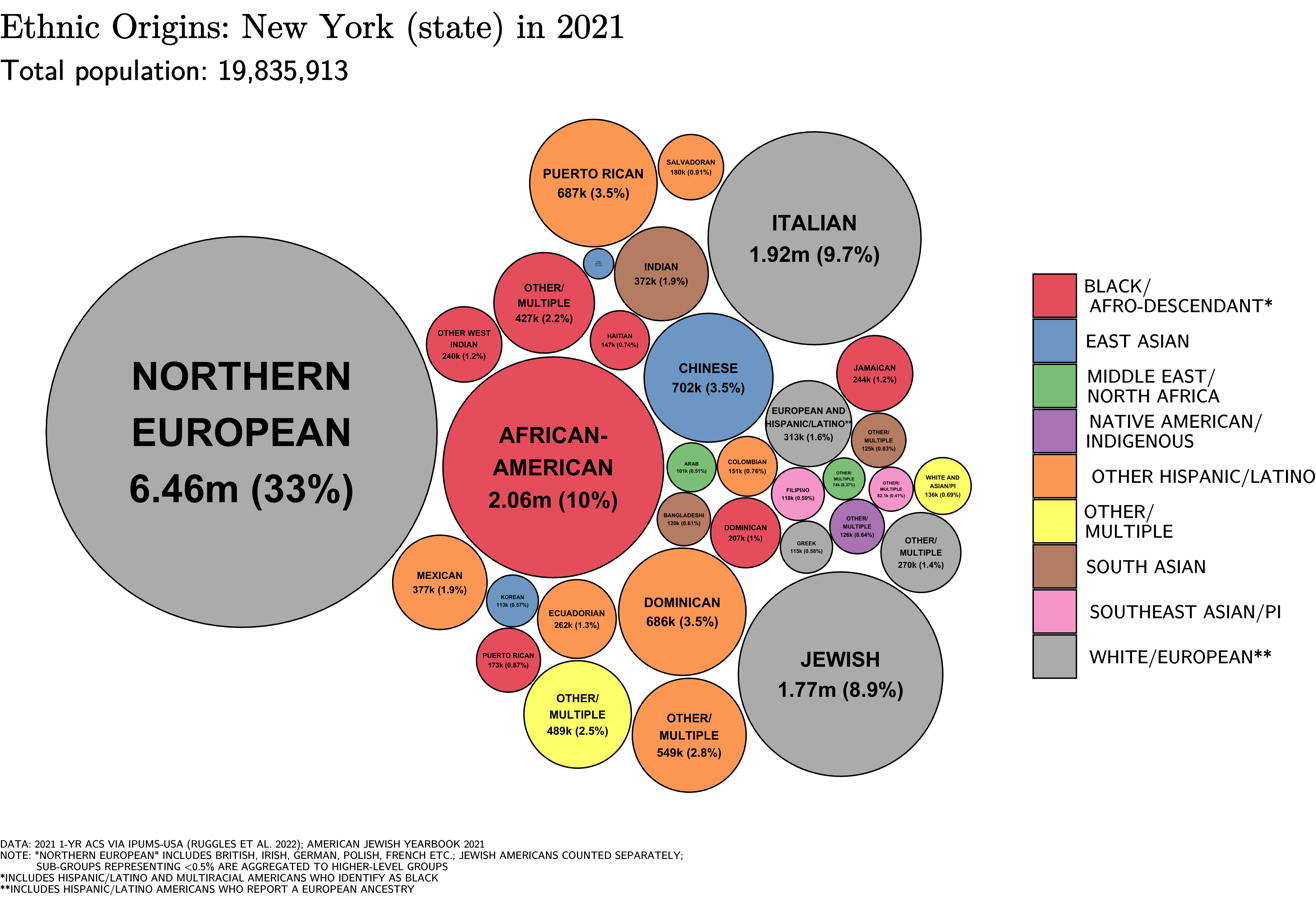
Ethnic origins in New York

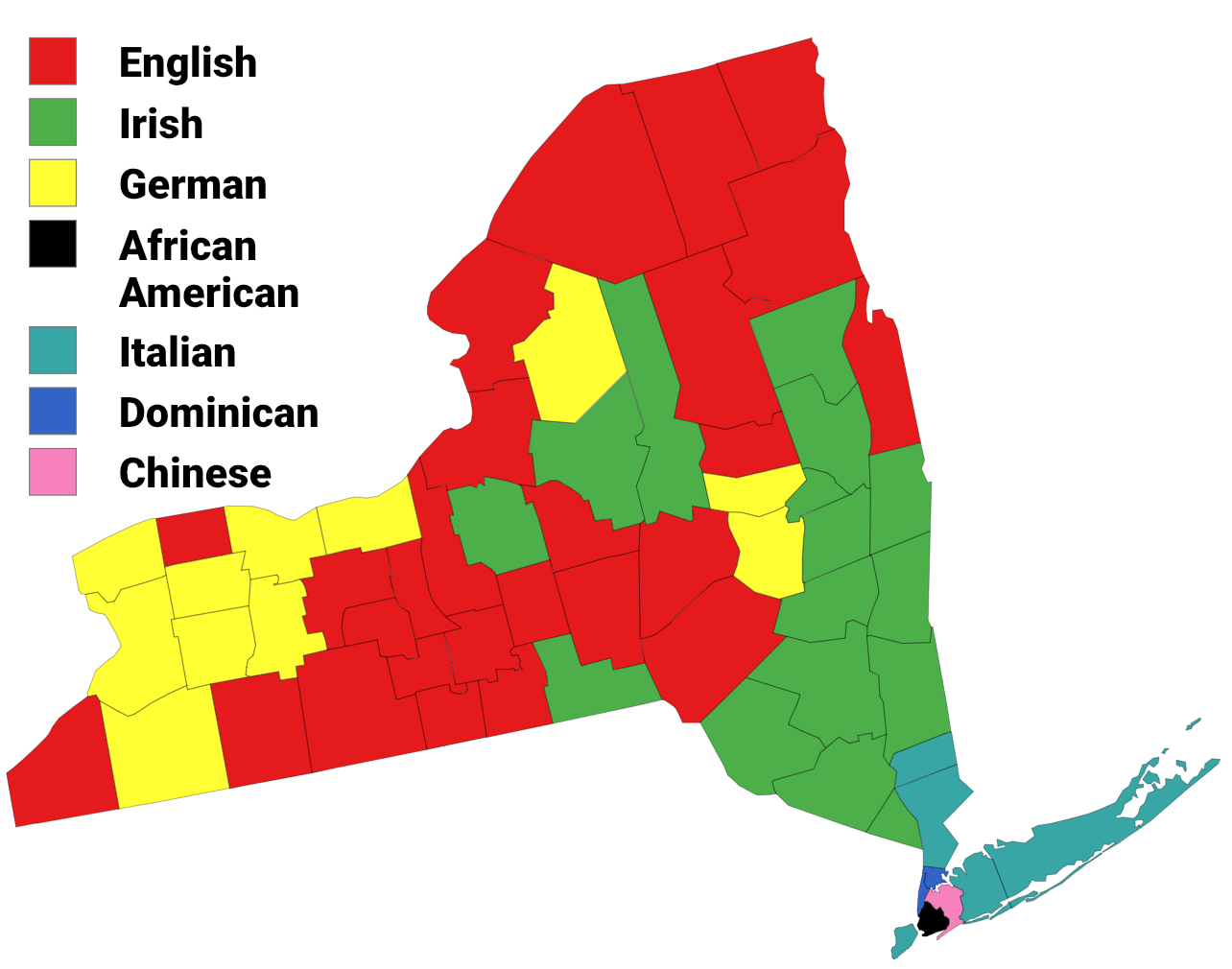
Largest alone or in any combination ethnic origin by county in New York (state), per the 2020 census

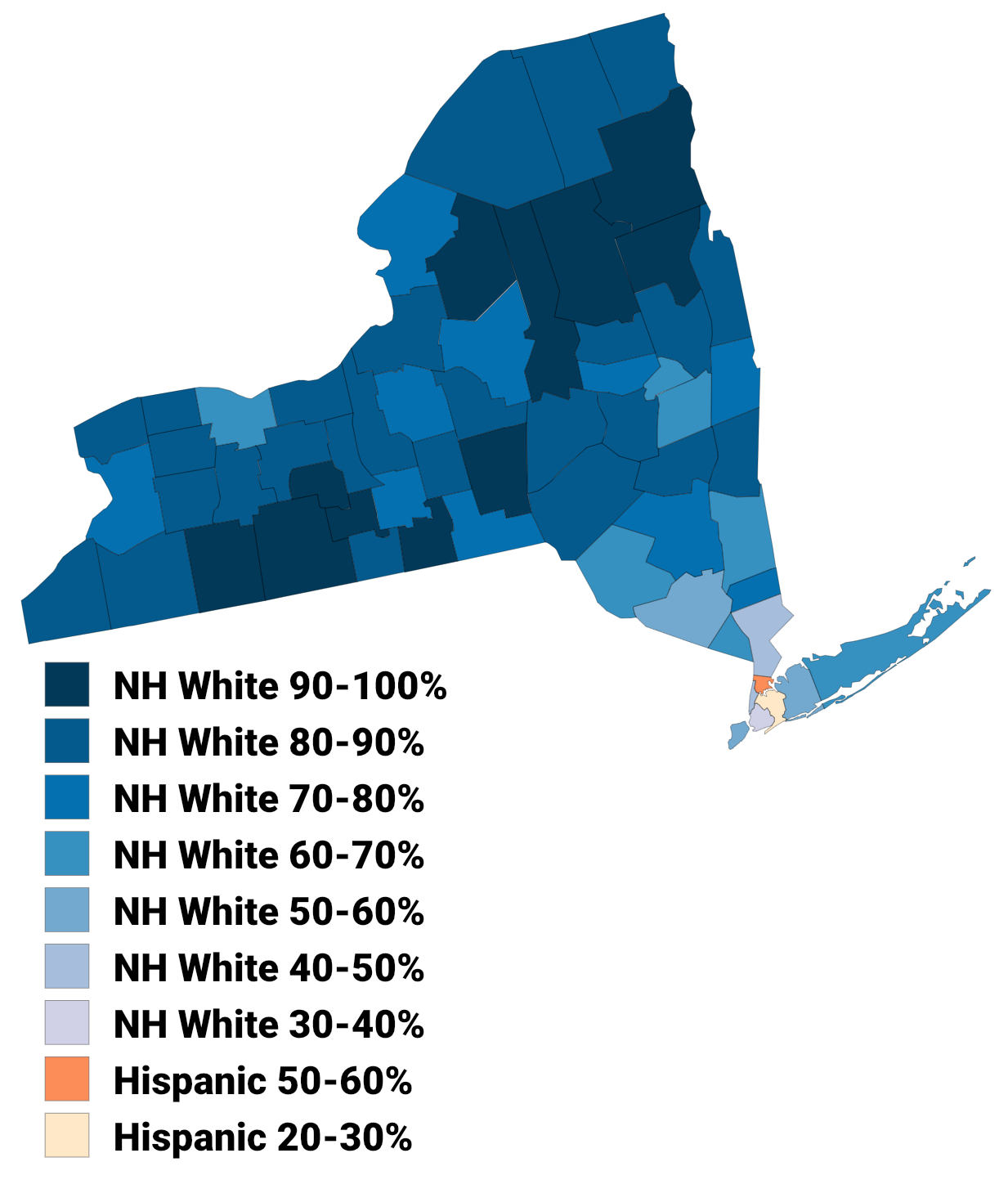
Map of counties in New York (State) by racial and ethnic plurality, per the 2020 U.S. census

Racial and ethnic composition as of the 2020 census
Race and ethnicity	Alone	Total
White (non-Hispanic)	52.5%	55.3%
Hispanic or Latino (Note: Persons of Hispanic or Latino origin are not distinguished between total and partial ancestry.)	—	19.5%
African American (non-Hispanic)	13.7%	15.1%
Asian	9.5%	10.5%
Native American	0.3%	1.1%
Pacific Islander	0.03%	0.1%
Other	1.0%	2.2%

According to the 2000 census, Italian, Irish, German, African American and English were the most common ancestries.

The state's historically most populous racial group, non-Hispanic White people, declined as a proportion of the state population from 94.6% in 1940 to 58.3% in 2010. As of 2011, 55.6% of New York's population younger than age 1 were minorities. New York's robustly increasing Jewish population, the largest outside of Israel, was the highest among states both by percentage and by absolute number in 2012. It is driven by the high reproductive rate of Orthodox Jewish families, particularly in Brooklyn and communities of the Hudson Valley.

New York is home to the second-largest Asian American population and the fourth-largest Black or African American population in the United States. New York's Black and African population increased by 2.0% between 2000 and 2010, to 3,073,800. In 2019, the Black and African American population increased to an estimated 3,424,002. The Black or African American population is in a state of flux, as New York is the largest recipient of immigrants from Africa, while established Blacks and African Americans are migrating out of New York to the southern United States. The New York City neighborhood of Harlem has historically been a major cultural capital for Blacks and African Americans of sub-Saharan descent, and Bedford-Stuyvesant in Brooklyn has the largest such population in the United States. Meanwhile, New York's Asian population increased by a notable 36% from 2000 to 2010, to 1,420,244; in 2019, its population grew to an estimated 1,579,494. Queens, in New York City, is home to the state's largest Asian American population and is the most ethnically diverse county in the United States and the most ethnically diverse urban area in the world.

New York's growing Hispanic and Latino American population numbered 3,416,922 in 2010, a 19% increase from the 2,867,583 enumerated in 2000. In 2020, it numbered an estimated 3,811,000. Queens is home to the largest Andean (Colombian, Ecuadorian, Peruvian, and Bolivian) populations in the United States. In addition, New York has the largest Puerto Rican, Dominican, and Jamaican American populations in the continental United States. The Chinese population constitutes the fastest-growing nationality in the State of New York, which is the top destination for new Chinese immigrants, and large-scale Chinese immigration continues into the state. Multiple satellites of the original Manhattan Chinatown, in Brooklyn, and around Flushing, Queens, are thriving as traditionally urban enclaves, while also expanding rapidly eastward into suburban Nassau County, on Long Island. Long Island, including Queens and Nassau County, is also home to several Little Indias and a large Koreatown, with large and growing attendant populations of Indian Americans and Korean Americans, respectively. Brooklyn has been a destination for West Indian immigrants of African descent, as well as Asian Indian immigrants. The annual New York City India Day Parade, held on or approximately every August 15 since 1981, is the world's largest Indian Independence Day parade outside of India.

In the 2000 U.S. census, New York had the largest Italian American population, composing the largest self-identified ancestral group in Staten Island and Long Island, followed by Irish Americans. Albany and the Mohawk Valley also have large communities of ethnic Italians and Irish Americans, reflecting 19th and early 20th-century immigration. According to the 2011–2015 American Community Survey, New York also had the largest Greek American population, enumerating 148,637 individuals (0.7% of the state). In Buffalo and Western New York, German Americans comprise the largest ancestry. In the North Country of New York, French Canadians represent the leading ethnicity, given the area's proximity to Quebec. Americans of English ancestry are present throughout all of upstate New York, reflecting early colonial and later immigrants. There is also a Romani (Gypsy) community in New York. Scottish Americans are also present in the state. Mexican Americans are one of the largest Latino groups in New York.

Racial composition	1950	1970	1990	2010	2020	Largest ancestry by county (2017)
White	93.5%	86.8%	74.4%	65.7%	55.2%	American English French/French Canadian German Irish Italian Caribbean
Black or African American	6.2%	11.9%	15.9%	15.9%	14.8%	American English French/French Canadian German Irish Italian Caribbean
American Indian and Alaska Native	0.1%	0.2%	0.3%	0.6%	0.7%	American English French/French Canadian German Irish Italian Caribbean
Asian	0.2%	0.7%	3.9%	7.3%	9.6%	American English French/French Canadian German Irish Italian Caribbean
Native Hawaiian and other Pacific Islander	–	–	–	–	0.1%	American English French/French Canadian German Irish Italian Caribbean
Other race	–	0.4%	5.5%	7.4%	10.9%	American English French/French Canadian German Irish Italian Caribbean
Two or more races	–	–	–	3.0%	8.7%	American English French/French Canadian German Irish Italian Caribbean
Hispanic or Latino	−	−	12.3%	17.6%	19.5%	

In 2018, the top countries of origin for New York's immigrants were the Dominican Republic, China, Mexico, Jamaica and India.

=== Languages ===
10 most spoken languages in New York (2024)
Language	Population
English	68.35%
Spanish	15.01%
Chinese (incl. Cantonese and Mandarin)	3.43%
Russian	1.11%
Bengali	1.02%
Haitian Creole	0.85%
French	0.72%
Arabic	0.67%
Italian	0.6%
Korean	0.47%

In 2024, the most common languages spoken at home in New York state were English (12,869,930, or 68.35% of the population), Spanish (2,826,836, or 15.01%), Chinese (646,302, or 3.43%), Russian (209,622, or 1.11%), Bengali (192,476, or 1.02%), Haitian Creole (160,537, or 0.85%), French (134,665, or 0.72%), Arabic (126,988, or 0.67%), Italian (112,899, or 0.6%), and Korean (88,591, or 0.47%). Of those residents who did not speak English at home, 3,252,745 residents (17.28% of the state) could also speak English "very well", and 2,705,506 residents (14.37% of the state) could not speak English "very well". Overall, 16,122,675 residents of New York state (85.63% of the population) either speak English at home or can speak it "very well", and it serves as the state's main language.

In 1910, the most spoken languages in New York state were English (5,178,081, or 56.82% of the population), (Note: Sum of all 1,813,885 respondents "of foreign stock" (either foreign-born or with at least one foreign-born parent) who listed "White" as their ethnicity and "English" as their mother tongue, all 3,230,005 who listed "White" as their ethnicity and were native-born to native-born parents, and all 134,191 respondents who listed "Negro" as their ethnicity.) German (1,333,013, or 14.63%), Yiddish (912,692, or 10.01%), Italian (745,669, or 8.18%), and Polish (283,733, or 3.11%).

In 2010, the most common American English dialects spoken in New York, besides General American English, were the New York City area dialect (including New York Latino English and North Jersey English), the Western New England accent around Albany, and Inland Northern American English in Buffalo and western New York State. As many as 800 languages are spoken in New York City, making it the most linguistically diverse city in the world.

=== Sexual orientation and gender identity ===
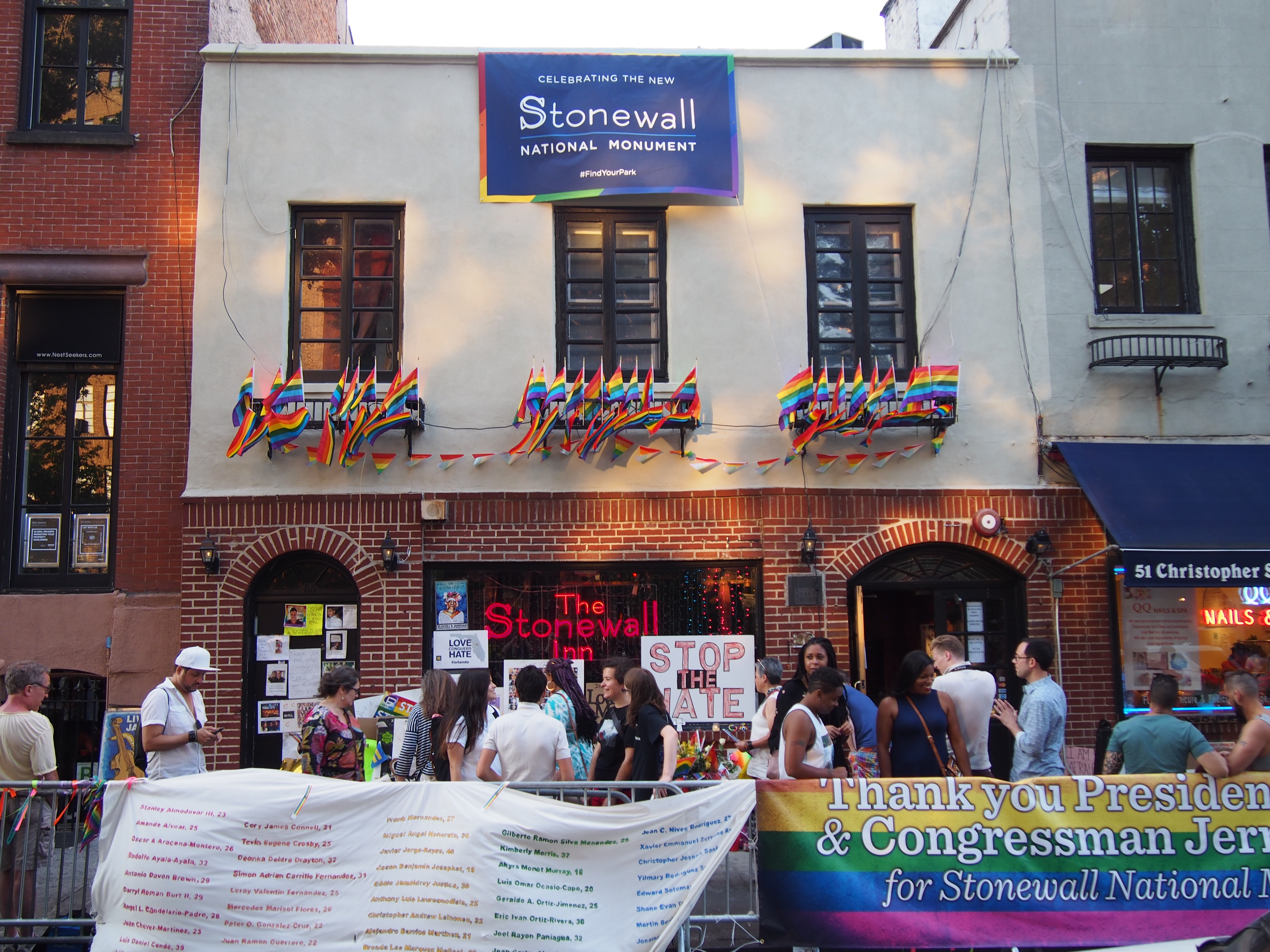
Stonewall Inn in Greenwich Village, site of the June 1969 Stonewall riots, the cradle of the modern LGBT rights movement

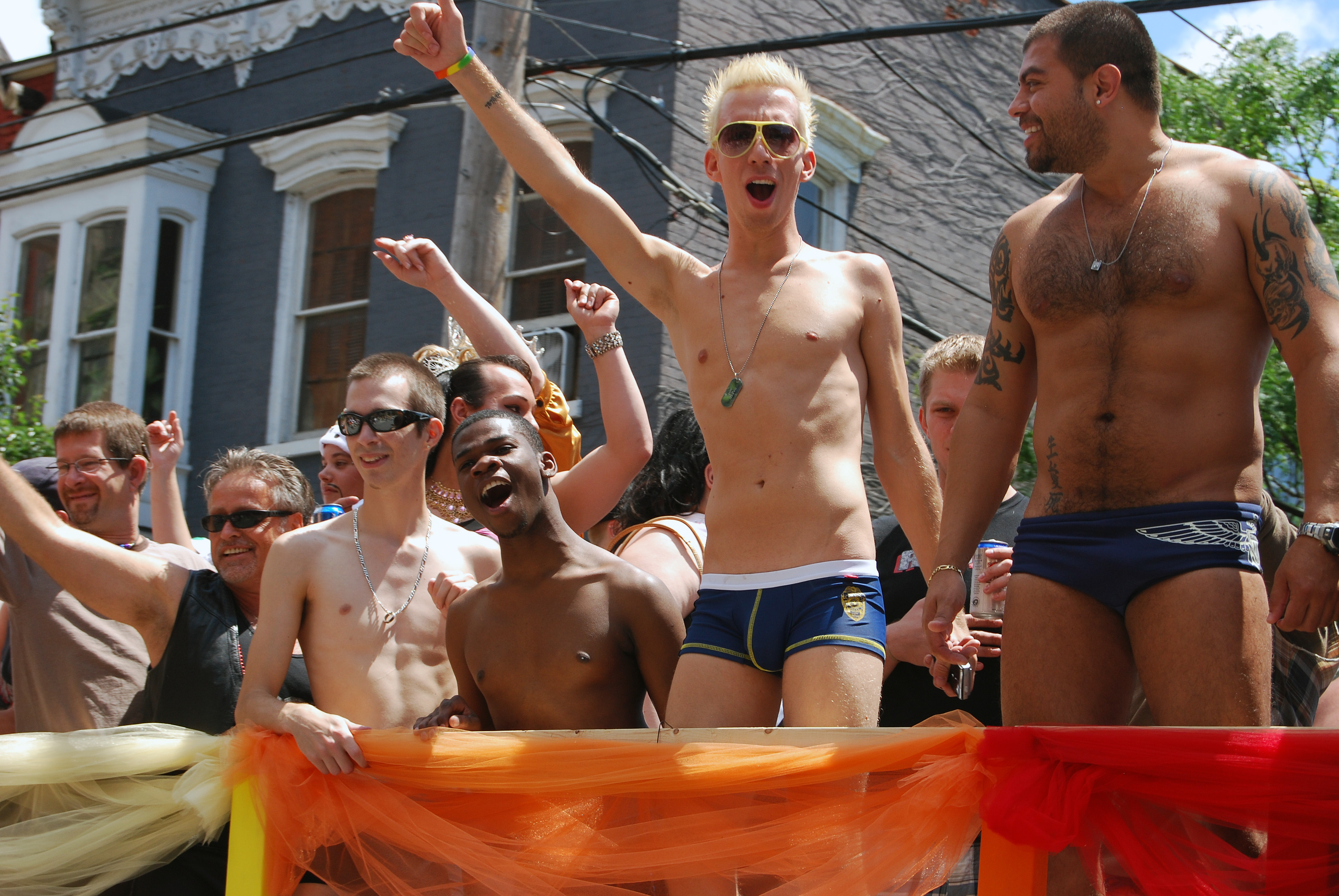
The Capital Gay Pride Parade and Festival in Albany, the largest celebration of LGBTQ+ culture in Upstate New York

In 2013, roughly 3.8 percent of the state's adult population self-identified as lesbian, gay, bisexual, or transgender, constituting a total LGBT adult population in the state of 570,388 individuals. In 2010, the number of same-sex couple households stood at roughly 48,932. New York legalized same-sex marriage on July 24, 2011; one of the first U.S. states to have done so.

New York City has been described as the gay capital of the world and the central node of the LGBTQ+ sociopolitical ecosystem, and is home to one of the world's largest LGBTQ populations and the most prominent. In July 2012, Michael Bloomberg, Mayor of New York City from 2002 to 2013, said "same-sex marriages in New York City had generated an estimated $259 million in economic impact and $16 million in City revenues" in the first year after enactment of the Marriage Equality Act. New York City is home to the nation's largest transgender population, estimated at 25,000 as of 2016. The annual NYC Pride March, the largest pride parade in North America held annually in June, traverses down Fifth Avenue in Manhattan and ends in Greenwich Village.

==== Stonewall riots ====
On June 29, 1969, the Stonewall riots were a series of spontaneous, violent protests by members of the gay community against a police raid at the Stonewall Inn in Greenwich Village. They are considered to constitute to be one the most important events leading to the gay liberation movement, and the modern LGBT rights movement.

The Stonewall National Monument, a national monument, commemorates the Stonewall riots. In June 2017, plans were announced for the first monument to LGBT individuals commissioned by the State of New York and planned to be built in Hudson River Park in Manhattan, near the Hudson River waterfront.

Stonewall 50 – WorldPride NYC 2019 commemorated the 50th anniversary of the Stonewall Riots and was the largest LGBTQ+ pride event in world history, attracting four million attendees in New York City. The Brooklyn Liberation March, the largest transgender-rights demonstration in LGBTQ history, took place on June 14, 2020, stretching from Grand Army Plaza to the Fort Greene section of Brooklyn, focused on supporting Black transgender lives, drawing an estimated 15,000 to 20,000 participants.

=== Religion ===
Religious self-identification, per Public Religion Research Institute's 2022 American Values Survey
1. Catholicism (33.0%)
2. Protestantism (27.0%)
3. Unitarian/Universalist (1.00%)
4. Jehovah's Witness (1.00%)
5. Unaffiliated (26.0%)
6. Judaism (7.00%)
7. New Age (2.00%)
8. Buddhism (1.00%)
9. Islam (1.00%)
10. Hinduism (1.00%)

In 2014, the Pew Research Center released a study of New York's religious population, which found that a majority, 60%, were Christian. Christians were followed by the irreligious (27%), Judaism (7%), Islam (2%), Buddhism and Hinduism (1% each), and other faiths (0.5%). Through another study by the Public Religion Research Institute in 2020, the majority of New York's religious or spiritual population were 67% Christian, followed by the irreligious (22%), Judaism (4%), Islam (2%), Buddhism and Hinduism (1% each), and other faiths (1%).

Prior to the 1800s, Protestant denominations dominated the religious life of New York, although religion did not play as large a role in the public life of colonial-era New Netherland as it did in New England, with its Puritan population. Historically, New York served as the foundation for new Christian denominations in the Second Great Awakening. Non-Western Christian traditions and non-Christian religions did not grow for much of the state's history because immigration was predominantly from Western Europe (favored by the quotas in federal immigration law). The Immigration and Nationality Act of 1965 removed the quotas, allowing for the growth of other religious groups.

The Roman Catholic Church was the largest Christian denomination in New York as of 2014's study (31%). The largest Roman Catholic diocese was the Latin Church's Archdiocese of New York. The largest Eastern Catholic diocese was the Ruthenian Catholic Eparchy of Passaic of the Ruthenian Greek Catholic Church. The United Methodist Church was the largest Mainline Protestant denomination and second-largest overall, followed by the Episcopal Church in the U.S. and other Continuing Anglican bodies. The Presbyterian Church (USA), Evangelical Lutheran Church in America, and American Baptist Churches USA were the following largest Mainline denominations. Mainline Protestants together made up 11% of Christians in the state as of 2014. In Evangelical Protestantism, the Baptists, non-denominational Protestants, and Pentecostals were the largest groups. The National Baptist Convention (USA) and Progressive National Baptist Convention were the largest historically black Protestant churches in New York. Roughly 10% of Christians in New York identified as Evangelical Protestants as of 2014. Additionally, the Eastern and Oriental Orthodox collectively comprised 1% of the religious demographic alongside Jehovah's Witnesses and other Christians; the Orthodox Christians in 2020's study made up 1% of the population, and Jehovah's Witnesses grew to 1% of the population as well.

According to the Pew Research Center, non-Christian religions accounted for 12% of New York state's population in 2020. Judaism was the second-largest religion as of 2014 and 2020. In 2010, 588,500 practiced Orthodox Judaism. A little over 392,953 professed Islam. The Powers Street Mosque in New York City was the state's first Muslim organization. New York is also home to the oldest Zoroastrian fire temple in the nation. Less than 1% of New York's population practiced New Age and contemporary paganism. Native American religions were also a minority religion. Statewide, 17% were not religiously practicing, 5% identified as agnostic, and 5% as atheist.

== Economy ==
According to the U.S. Bureau of Economic Analysis, the State of New York's gross domestic product was $2.467 trillion and its per capita personal income was $88,847 in 2025. If the State of New York were an independent nation, it would rank as the 11th-largest economy in the world. However, in 2022, the multi-state, New York City-centered metropolitan statistical area produced a gross metropolitan product (GMP) of over US$2.16 trillion, the largest metropolitan economy worldwide and behind the GDP of only nine nations. In 2025, 99.8% of New York businesses were small businesses and employed 46.6% of the state's work force, or 3.9 million people, according to the U.S. Small Business Administration Office of Advocacy. Over 267,000 new businesses formed within the state in 2025.

=== Wall Street ===
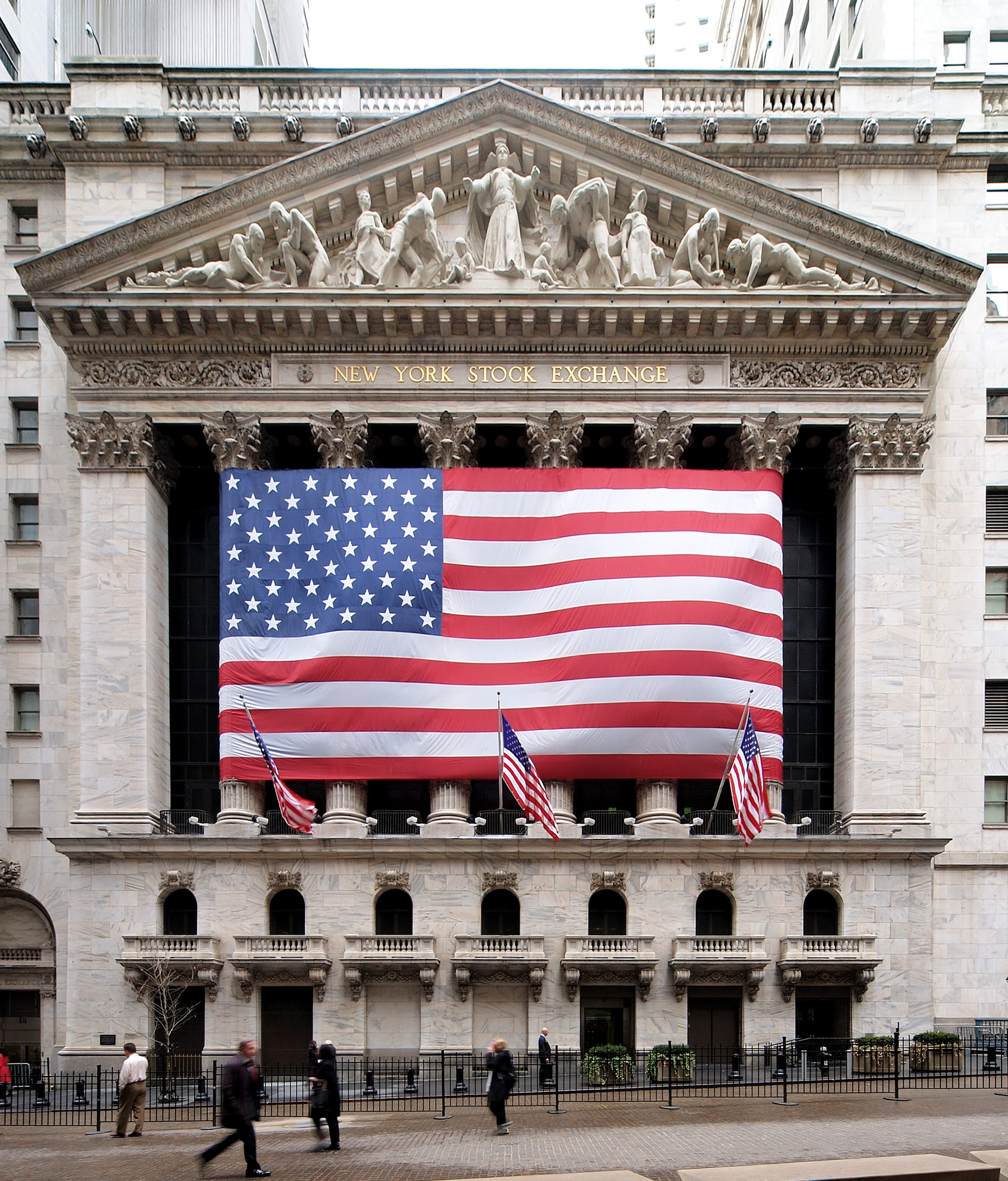
The New York Stock Exchange, the world's largest stock exchange by total market capitalization of its listed companies

Anchored by Wall Street in the Financial District of Lower Manhattan, New York City has been called both the most economically powerful city and the leading financial center of the world. Lower Manhattan is the third-largest central business district in the United States and is home to the New York Stock Exchange, on Wall Street, and Nasdaq, at 165 Broadway, representing the world's largest and second-largest stock exchanges, respectively, as measured both by overall average daily trading volume and by total market capitalization of their listed companies in 2023.

New York City remains the largest global center for trading in public equity and debt capital markets, driven in part by the size and financial development of the U.S. economy. New York also leads in private equity and the monetary volume of mergers and acquisitions. Several financial institutions and related managers based in Manhattan are important participants in other global financial centers. New York is also the principal commercial banking center of the United States.

Many of the world's largest media conglomerates are also based in the city. Manhattan contained approximately 520 million square feet (48.1 million m^{2}) of office space in 2013, making it the largest office market in the United States, while Midtown Manhattan is the largest central business district in the world.

=== High technology ===
==== Silicon Alley eastward throughout Long Island ====
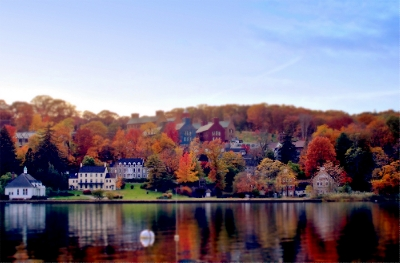
Cold Spring Harbor Laboratory on the North Shore of Long Island, an internationally renowned biomedical research facility and home to eight scientists awarded the Nobel Prize in Physiology or Medicine

Silicon Alley, once confined to Manhattan, evolved into a metonym for the sphere encompassing the New York City metropolitan region's high technology and entrepreneurship ecosystem. High tech industries including digital media, biotechnology, software development, game design, and other fields in information technology are growing, bolstered by New York City's position at the terminus of several transatlantic fiber optic trunk lines, its intellectual capital, as well as its growing outdoor wireless connectivity.

In December 2014, the State of New York announced a US$50 million venture-capital fund to encourage enterprises working in biotechnology and advanced materials; according to former Governor Andrew Cuomo, the seed money would facilitate entrepreneurs in bringing their research into the marketplace.

On December 19, 2011, then Mayor Michael R. Bloomberg announced his choice of Cornell University and Technion-Israel Institute of Technology to build a two billion dollar graduate school of applied sciences on Roosevelt Island in Manhattan, with the goal of transforming New York City into the world's premier technology capital.

New York City's artificial intelligence (AI) sector alone raised US$483.6 million in venture capital investment in 2022. In 2023, New York unveiled the first comprehensive initiative to create both a framework of rules and a chatbot to regulate the use of AI within the sphere of city government.

Long Island is a prominent nexus for STEM-based education and technology. Biotechnology companies and scientific research play a significant role in Long Island's economy, including research facilities at Brookhaven National Laboratory, Cold Spring Harbor Laboratory, Stony Brook University, New York Institute of Technology, Plum Island Animal Disease Center, the New York University Tandon School of Engineering, the City University of New York, the Hofstra Northwell School of Medicine, and the Feinstein Institutes for Medical Research.

==== Tech Valley ====
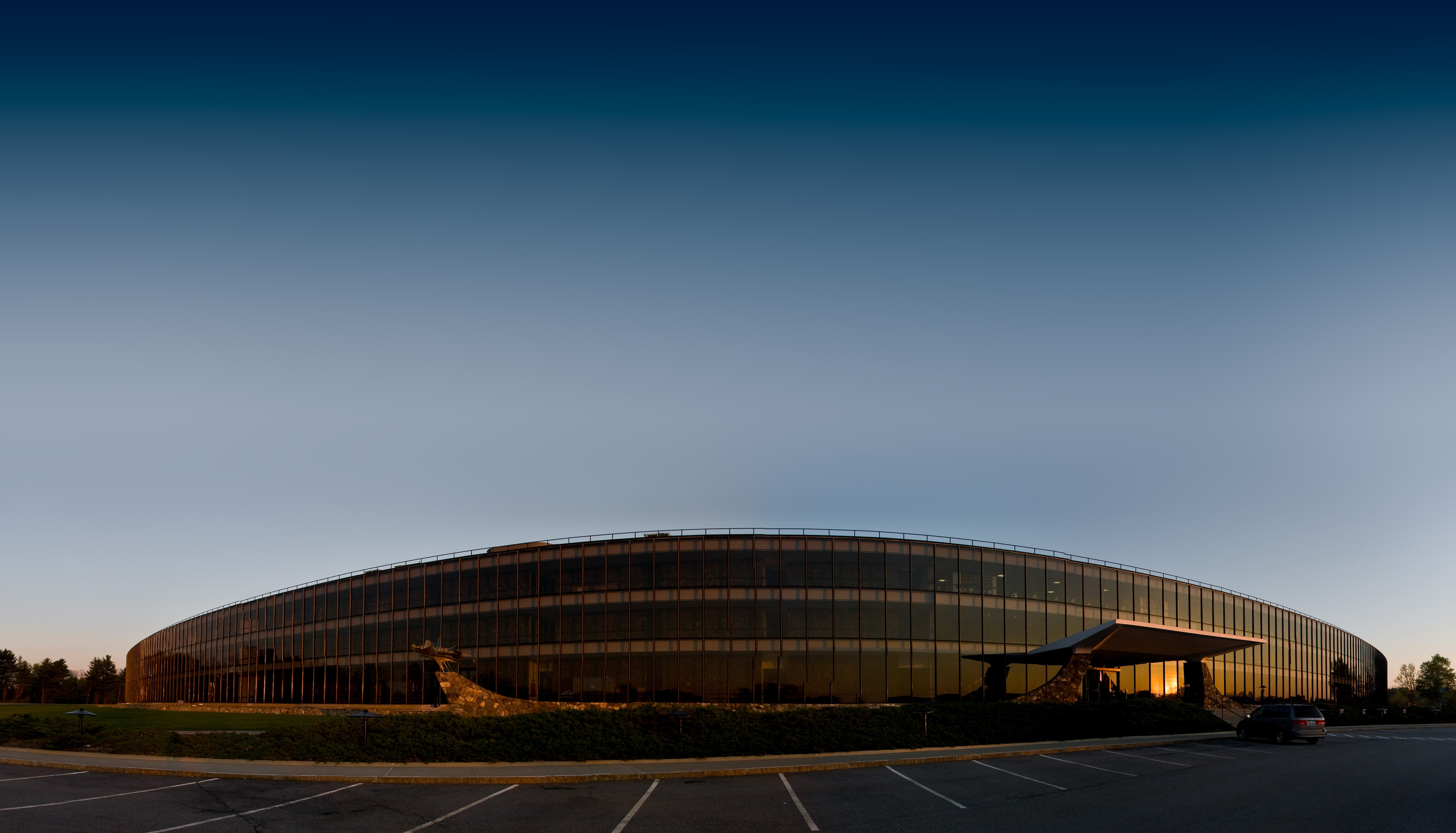
The main laboratory building of the IBM Watson Research Center in Yorktown Heights

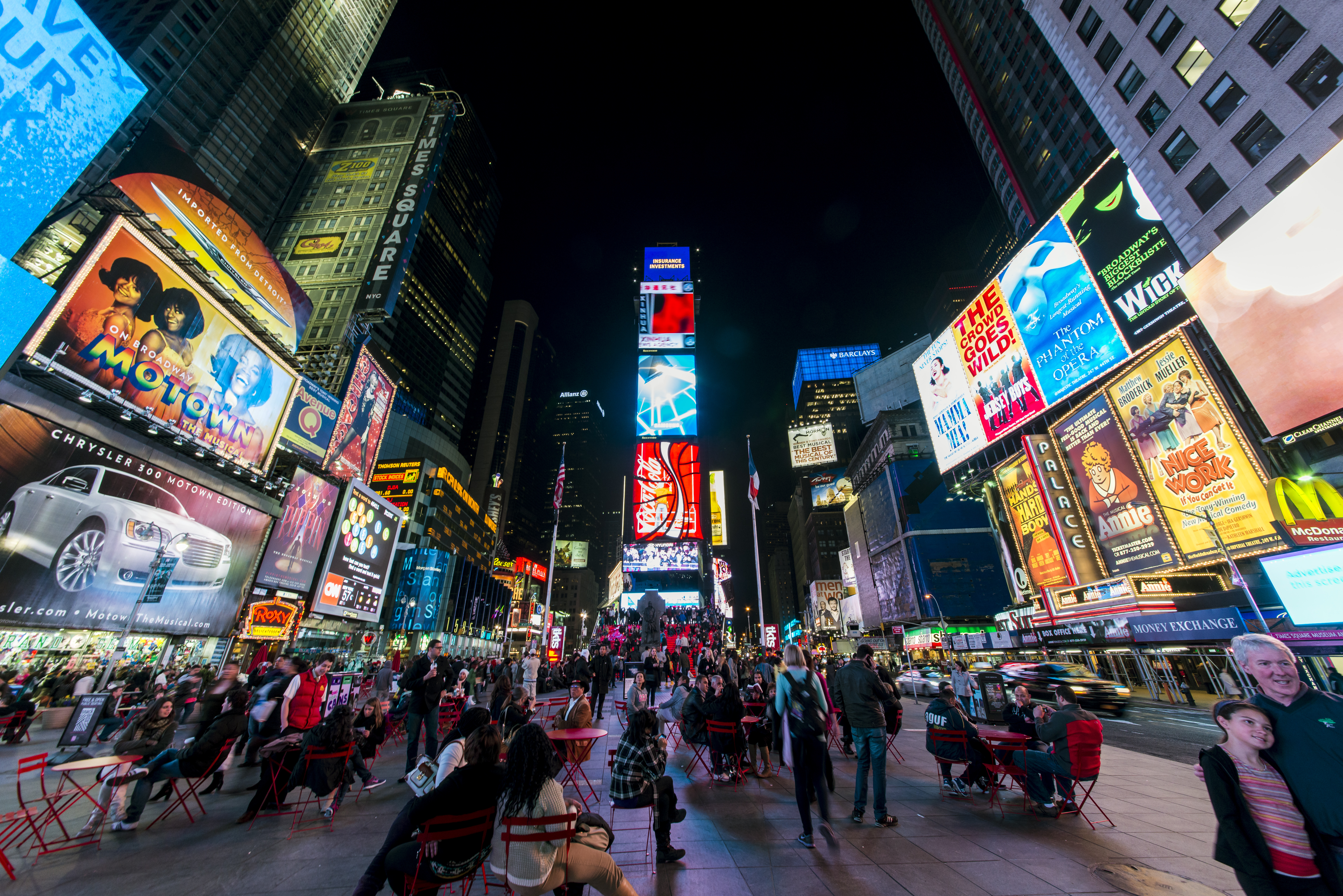
Times Square in Midtown Manhattan, hub of the Broadway's theater district, a media center, and one of the world's busiest pedestrian intersections

Albany, Saratoga County, Rensselaer County, and the Hudson Valley, collectively recognized as eastern New York's Tech Valley, have experienced significant growth in the computer hardware ecosystem within the high-technology industry, making great strides in the nanotechnology sector, digital electronics design, and water- and electricity-dependent integrated microchip circuit manufacturing, involving companies including IBM and its Thomas J. Watson Research Center, and the three foreign-owned firms, GlobalFoundries, Samsung, and Taiwan Semiconductor, among others. The area's high technology ecosystem is supported by technologically focused academic institutions including Rensselaer Polytechnic Institute and the SUNY Polytechnic Institute.

In 2015, Tech Valley, straddling both sides of the Adirondack Northway and the New York Thruway, generated over $163 million in venture capital investment. The Rochester area is important in the field of photographic processing and imaging as well as incubating an increasingly diverse high technology sphere encompassing STEM fields, similarly in part the result of private startup enterprises collaborating with major academic institutions, including the University of Rochester and Cornell University.

Westchester County has developed a burgeoning biotechnology sector in the 21st century, with over a billion dollars in planned private investment as of 2016. In April 2021, GlobalFoundries, a company specializing in the semiconductor industry, moved its headquarters from Silicon Valley, California to its most advanced semiconductor-chip manufacturing facility in Saratoga County near a section of the Adirondack Northway, in Malta, New York.

=== Media and entertainment ===
Creative industries, which are concerned with generating and distributing knowledge and information, such as new media, digital media, film and television production, advertising, fashion, design, and architecture, account for a growing share of employment, with New York City possessing a strong competitive advantage in these industries. As of 2014, the State of New York was offering tax incentives of up to $420 million annually for filmmaking within the state, the most generous such tax rebate among U.S. states. New York has also attracted higher-wage visual-effects employment by further augmenting its tax credit to a maximum of 35% for performing post-film production work in Upstate New York. The filmed entertainment industry has been growing in New York, contributing nearly $9 billion to the New York City economy alone as of 2015.

"I Love New York"

=== Tourism ===
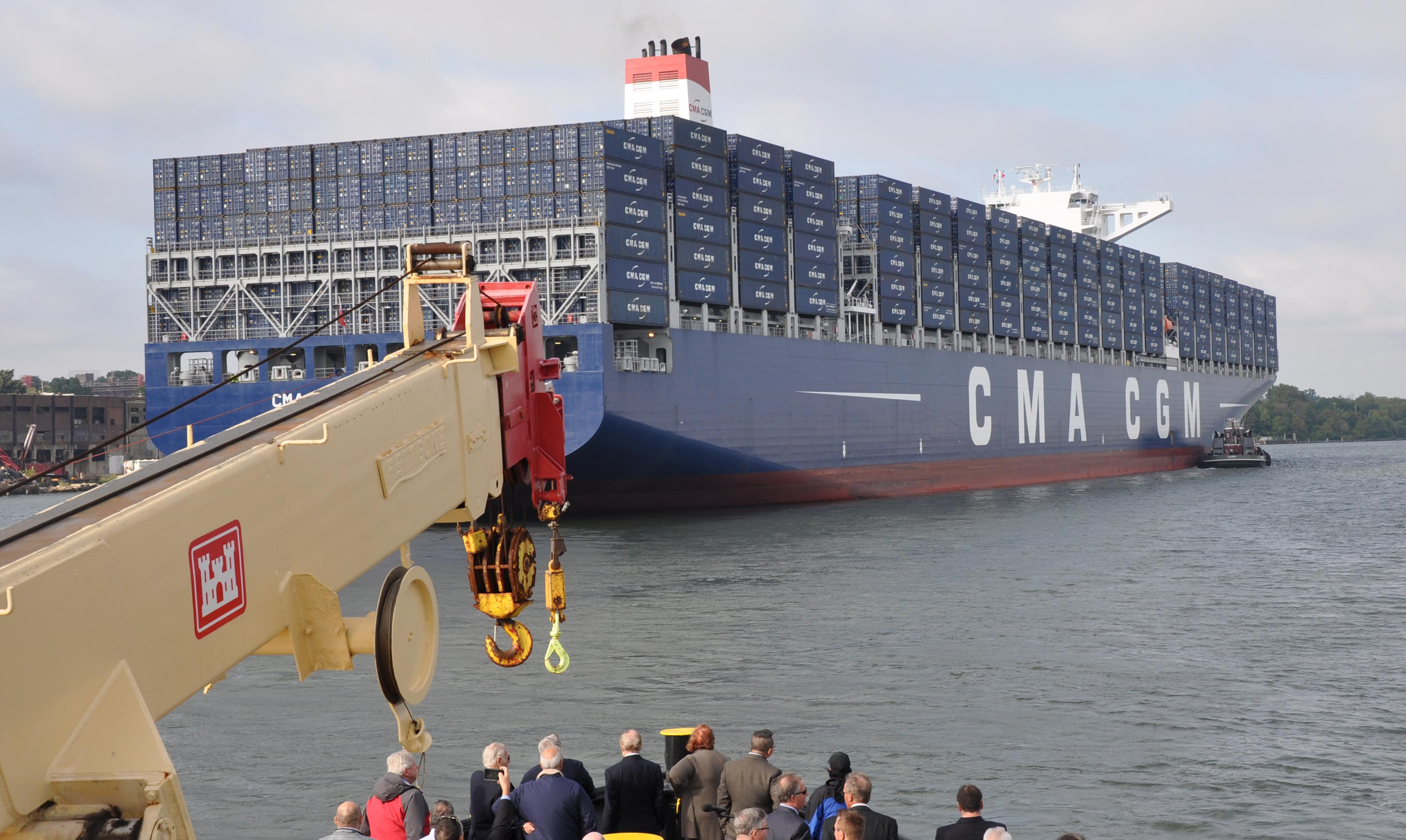
The Theodore Roosevelt, the largest container ship to enter the Port of New York and New Jersey as of September 2017

I Love New York (stylized as I ❤ NY) is a slogan, a logo, and state song that are the basis of an advertising campaign used since 1977 to promote tourism in the New York state, including New York City. The trademarked logo is owned by New York State Empire State Development. By 2025, tourism had become New York's second-largest industry (after finance), supporting one in 10 jobs and generating billions of dollars in economic impact annually. The Broadway League reported that Broadway shows sold approximately $1.27 billion worth of tickets in the 2013–2014 season, an 11.4% increase from $1.139 billion in the 2012–2013 season. Attendance in 2013–2014 stood at 12.21 million, representing a 5.5% increase from the 2012–2013 season's 11.57 million.

=== Exports ===
New York exports a wide variety of goods such as prepared foods, computers, and electronics, cut diamonds, and other commodities. New York's largest imports are oil, gold, aluminum, natural gas, electricity, rough diamonds, and lumber. The state also has a large manufacturing sector that includes printing and the production of garments, mainly in New York City; and furs, railroad equipment, automobile parts, and bus line vehicles, concentrated in Upstate regions.

New York is the nation's third-largest grape producing state, and third-largest wine producer by volume, behind California and Washington. The southern Finger Lakes hillsides, the Hudson Valley, the North Fork of Long Island, and the southern shore of Lake Erie are the primary grape- and wine-growing regions in New York, with many vineyards. In 2012, New York had 320 wineries and 37,000 grape bearing acres (15,000 ha), generating full-time employment for nearly 25,000 and annual wages over $1.1 billion, and yielding $4.8 billion in direct economic impact from New York grapes, grape juice, and wine and grape products.

=== Agriculture ===
The New York agriculture industry is a major producer overall, ranking among the top five states for agricultural products including maple syrup, apples, cherries, cabbage, dairy products, onions, and potatoes. The state is the largest producer of cabbage in the U.S. The state has about a quarter of its land in farms and produced $3.4 billion in agricultural products in 2001. The south shore of Lake Ontario provides the right mix of soils and microclimate for many apple, cherry, plum, pear and peach orchards. Apples are also grown in the Hudson Valley and near Lake Champlain. A moderately sized saltwater commercial fishery is located along the Atlantic side of Long Island. The principal catches by value are clams, lobsters, squid, and flounder.

=== Energy ===
In 2017, the State of New York consumed 156,370 gigawatthours (GWh) of electrical energy. Downstate regions (Hudson Valley, New York City, and Long Island) consumed 66% of that amount. Upstate regions produced 50% of that amount. The peak load in 2017 was 29,699 MW. The resource capability in 2017 was 42,839 MW. The NYISO's market monitor described the average all-in wholesale electric price as a range (a single value was not provided) from $25 per MWh to $53 per MWh for 2017.

=== Transportation ===
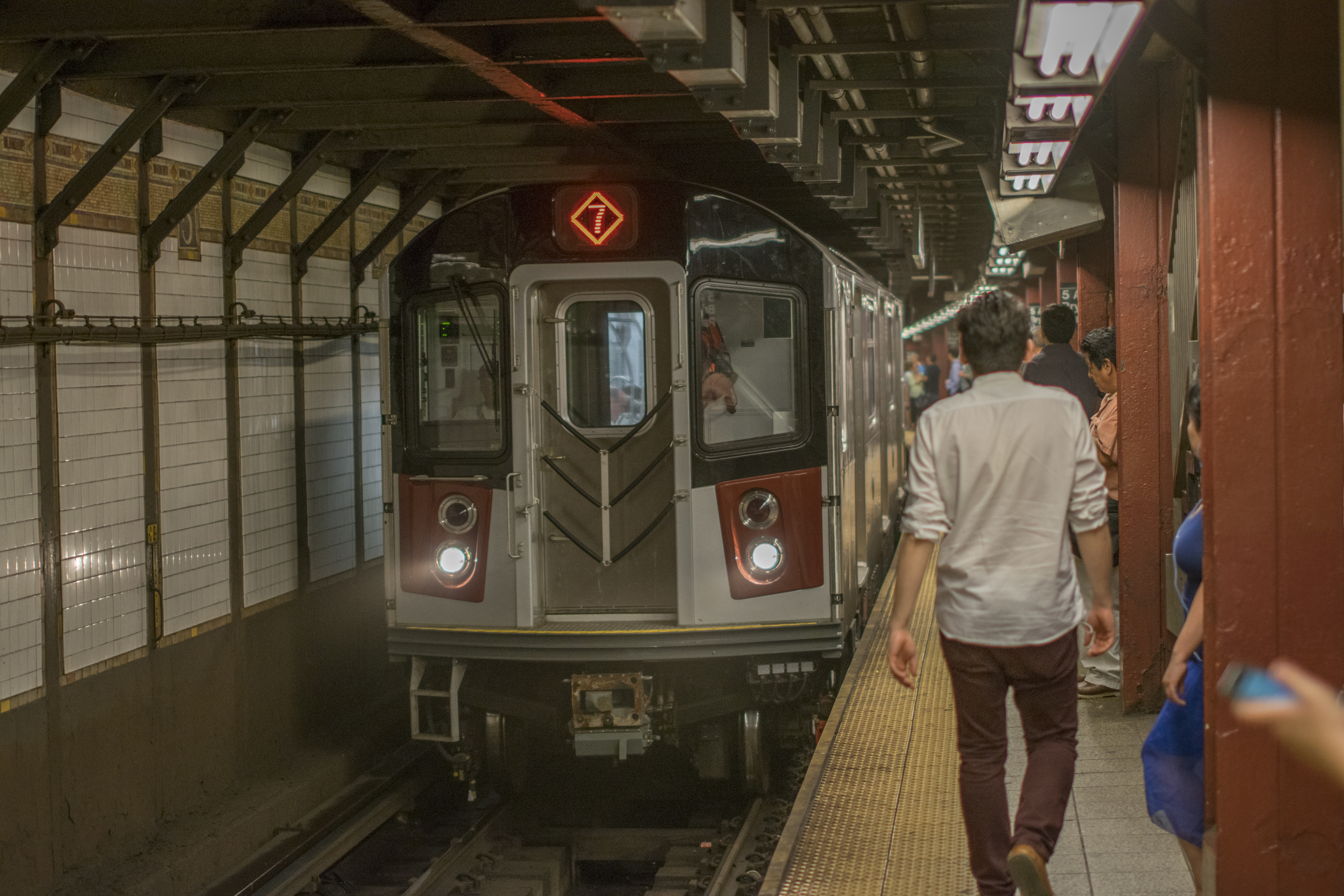
The New York City Subway, one of the world's busiest subway systems, serving over five million passengers each weekday

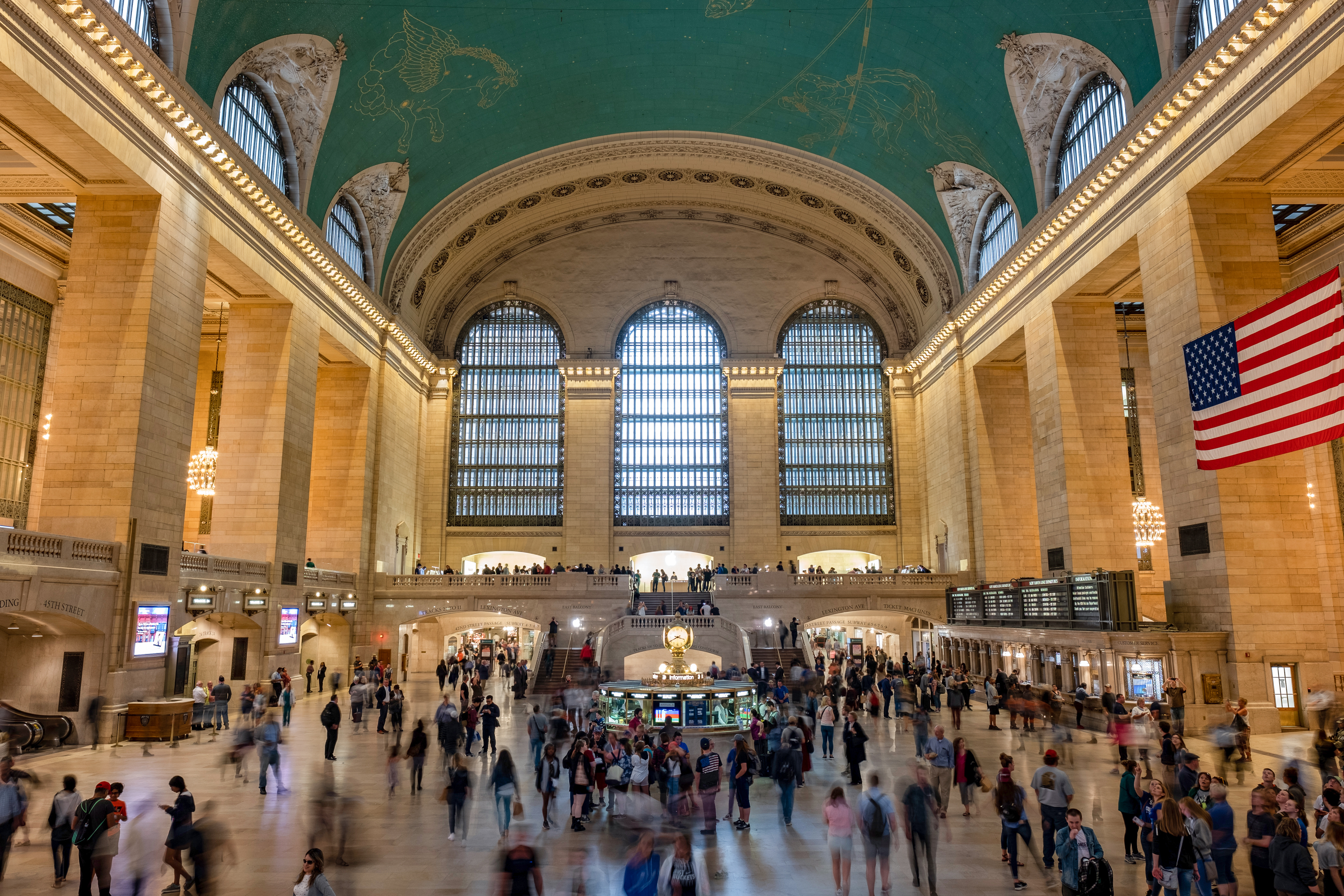
Grand Central Terminal in Manhattan

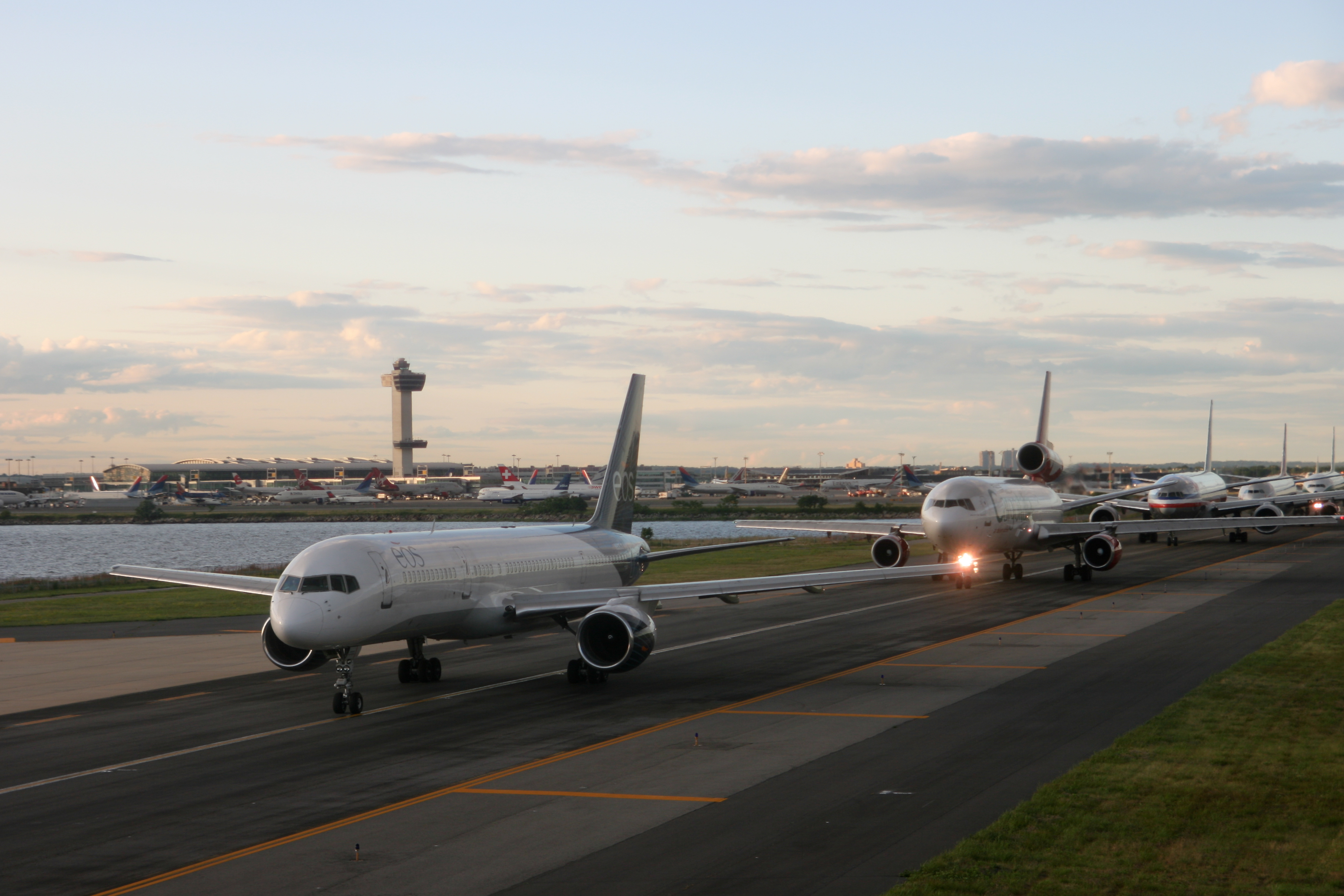
John F. Kennedy International Airport in Queens, the busiest international air passenger gateway to the United States

New York has one of the oldest and most extensive transportation infrastructures in the country. Engineering challenges posed by the complex terrain of the state and the unique infrastructural issues of New York City brought on by urban crowding have had to be overcome perennially. Population expansion of the state has followed the path of the early waterways, first the Hudson River and Mohawk River, then the Erie Canal. In the 19th century, railroads were constructed along the river valleys, followed by the New York State Thruway in the 20th century.

==== Roads and highways ====
The New York State Department of Transportation (NYSDOT) is the department of the government of New York responsible for the development and operation of highways, railroads, mass transit systems, ports, waterways, and aviation facilities within the State of New York. The NYSDOT is headquartered at 50 Wolf Road in Colonie, Albany County. The Port Authority of New York and New Jersey (PANYNJ) is a joint venture between the states of New York and New Jersey and authorized by the U.S. Congress, established in 1921 through an interstate compact, that oversees much of the regional transportation infrastructure, including bridges, tunnels, airports, and seaports, within the geographical jurisdiction of the Port of New York and New Jersey. This 1,500 sq mi (3,900 km^{2}) port district is generally encompassed within a 25 mi (40 km) radius of the Statue of Liberty National Monument. The Port Authority is headquartered at 4 World Trade Center in Lower Manhattan.

The New York State Department of Motor Vehicles (NYSDMV or DMV) is the governmental agency responsible for registering and inspecting automobiles and other motor vehicles, as well as licensing drivers in the State of New York. As of 2008, the NYSDMV has 11,284,546 drivers licenses on file and 10,697,644 vehicle registrations in force. All gasoline-powered vehicles registered in the State of New York are required to have an emissions inspection every 12 months, in order to ensure that environmental quality controls are working to prevent air pollution. Diesel-powered vehicles with a gross weight rating over 8,500 pounds that are registered in most Downstate New York counties must get an annual emissions inspection. All vehicles registered in the State of New York must get an annual safety inspection.

==== Passenger rail service ====
In addition to New York City Transit Authority (which includes the New York City Subway and Staten Island Railway) which is confined to the five boroughs of New York City, New York state has four suburban commuter railroad systems that enter and depart the city: the Long Island Rail Road, Metro-North Railroad, Port Authority Trans-Hudson, and five of New Jersey Transit's rail lines. The New York City Department of Transportation (NYCDOT) is the agency of the government of New York City responsible for the management of much of New York City's own transportation infrastructure.

Outside of the New York City metropolitan area, the Niagara Frontier Transportation Authority runs the Buffalo Metro Rail light-rail system.

==== Airports ====
Portions of the transportation system are intermodal, allowing travelers to switch easily from one mode of transportation to another. One of the most notable examples is AirTrain JFK which allows rail passengers to travel directly to terminals at John F. Kennedy International Airport and to the underground New York City Subway system.

== Education ==
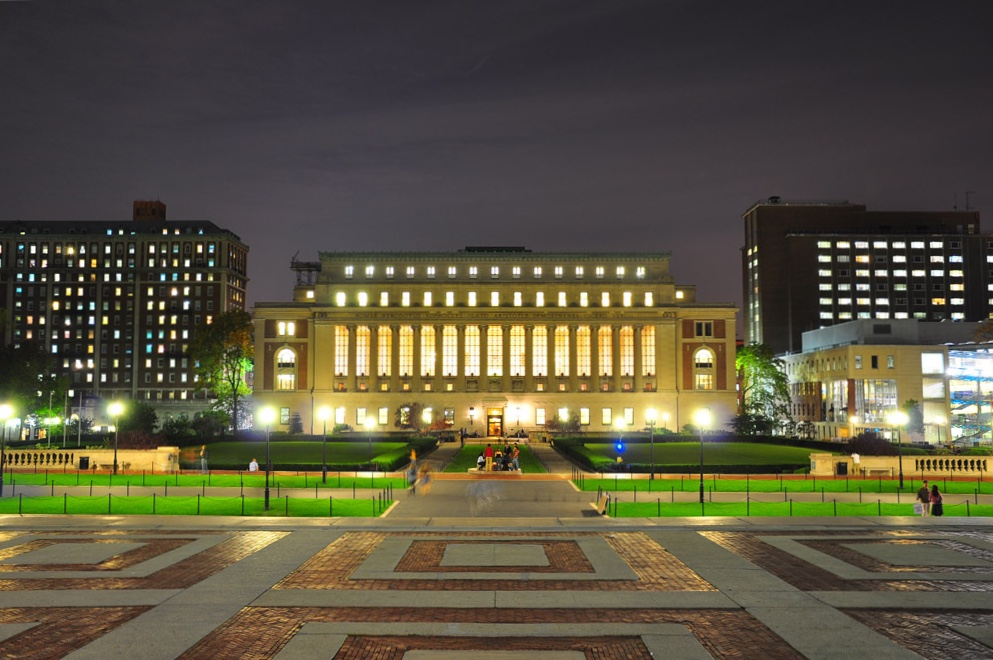
Butler Library at Columbia University, an Ivy League university in Upper Manhattan

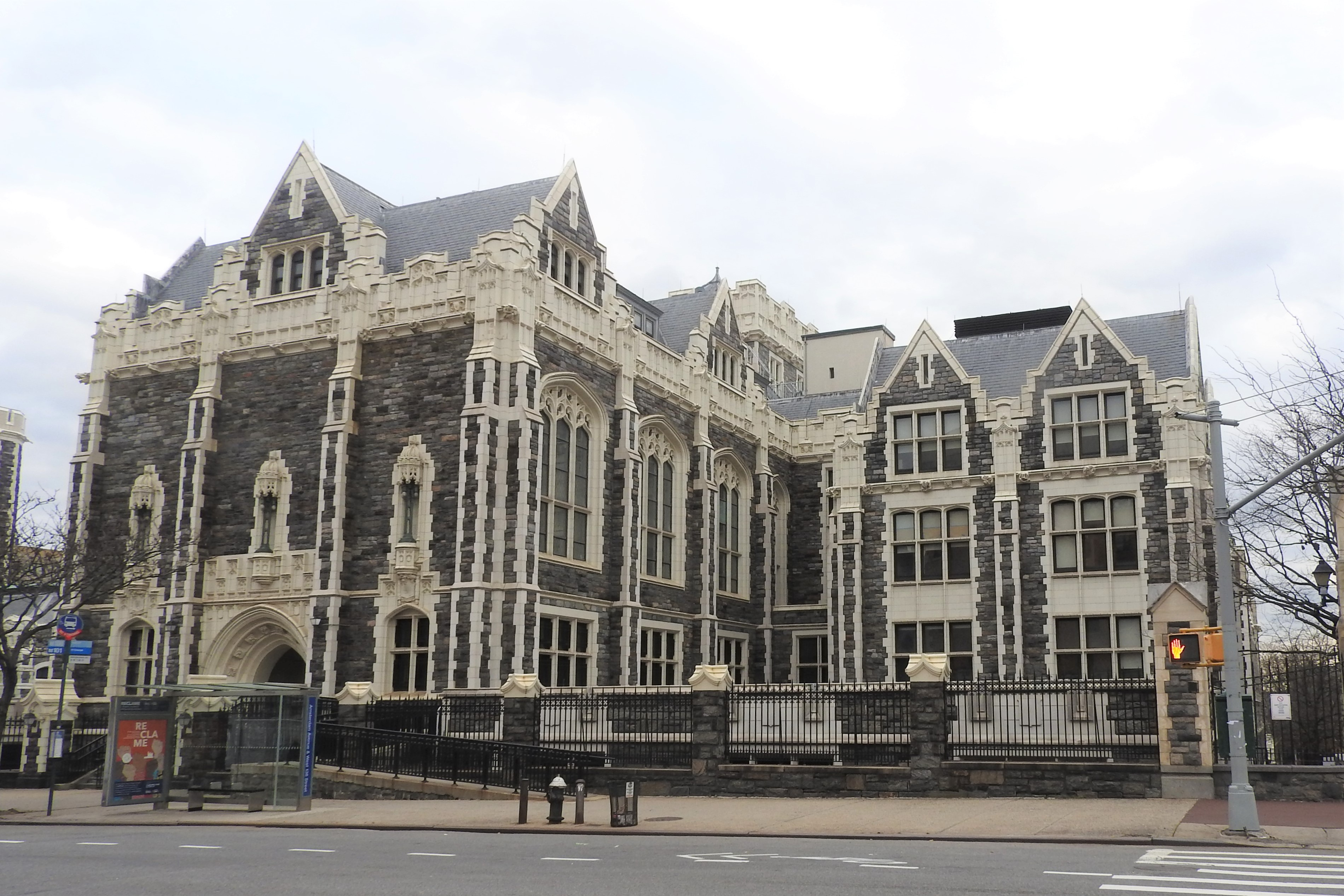
Harris Hall at City College of New York, a public college of the City University of New York in the Hamilton Heights section of Manhattan

Among all New York-based colleges and universities, Cornell University in Ithaca and Columbia University in Upper Manhattan, both Ivy League universities, are the most selective universities, and both are world-renowned private universities. New York University in Manhattan also ranks highly among New York state-based universities. Other large private universities include Syracuse University and Fordham University. Smaller private institutions of higher education include University of Rochester, Rockefeller University, Mercy University, New York Institute of Technology, Rensselaer Polytechnic Institute, Yeshiva University, and Hofstra University. There are also a multitude of postgraduate-level schools in the State of New York, including medical, law, and engineering schools such as New York Medical College and New York Law School.

The United States Military Academy at West Point, the service academy of the U.S. Army, is located just south of Newburgh, on the west bank of the Hudson River. The federal Merchant Marine Academy is at Kings Point on Long Island.

In post-secondary education, the statewide public university system is the State University of New York (SUNY). The SUNY system consists of 64 community colleges, technical colleges, undergraduate colleges, and doctoral-granting institutions. The SUNY system has four "university centers": Albany (1844), Buffalo (1846), Binghamton (1946), and Stony Brook (1957), of which Buffalo and Stony Brook are the two flagship universities. The SUNY system is home to three academic medical centers: Renaissance School of Medicine at Stony Brook University on Long Island, Norton College of Medicine at SUNY Upstate Medical University in Syracuse, and SUNY Downstate Medical Center in Brooklyn.

The City University of New York is the public university system of New York City. It is the largest urban university system in the United States, comprising 25 campuses: eleven senior colleges, seven community colleges and seven professional institutions. While its constituent colleges date back as far as 1847, CUNY was established in 1961. The university enrolls more than 275,000 students, and counts thirteen Nobel Prize winners and twenty-four MacArthur Fellows among its alumni.

A number of selective private liberal arts institutions are located in New York. Among them are Adelphi University, Bard College, Barnard College, Colgate University, Hamilton College, Hobart and William Smith Colleges, Marist College, Sarah Lawrence College, Skidmore College, St. Lawrence University, Union College, and Vassar College. Two of these schools, Barnard and Vassar, are members of the selective Seven Sisters, originally all women's colleges with ties to the Ivy League. Barnard is affiliated with Columbia University, its Manhattan neighbor, and Vassar became coeducational in 1969 after declining an offer to merge with Yale University.

New York is also home to what are widely regarded as the best performing arts schools in the world. The Juilliard School, located on the Upper West Side of Manhattan, is one of the world's leading music and dance schools. The Eastman School of Music, a professional school within the University of Rochester, was ranked first among U.S. music schools by U.S. News & World Report for five consecutive years.

The University of the State of New York accredits and sets standards for elementary, middle-level, and secondary education in the state, while the New York State Education Department oversees public schools and controls their standardized tests. The New York City Department of Education manages the New York City Public Schools system. In 1894, reflecting general racial discrimination then, the state passed a law that allowed communities to set up separate schools for children of African-American descent. In 1900, the state passed another law requiring integrated schools. During the 2013 fiscal year, New York spent more on public education per pupil than any other state, according to U.S. Census Bureau statistics.

== Government ==
The New York State Capitol in Albany

The Government of New York embodies the governmental structure of the State of New York as established by the New York State Constitution. It is composed of three branches: executive, legislative, and judicial.

The governor is the state's chief executive and is assisted by the lieutenant governor. Both are elected on the same ticket. Additional elected officers include the attorney general and the comptroller. The secretary of state, formerly an elected officer, is currently appointed by the governor.

The New York State Legislature is bicameral and consists of the New York State Senate and the New York State Assembly. The state assembly consists of 150 members, while the state senate varies in its number of members, currently having 63. The legislature is empowered to make laws, subject to the governor's power to veto a bill. However, the veto may be overridden by the legislature if there is a two-thirds majority in favor of overriding in each house. The permanent laws of a general nature are codified in the Consolidated Laws of New York.

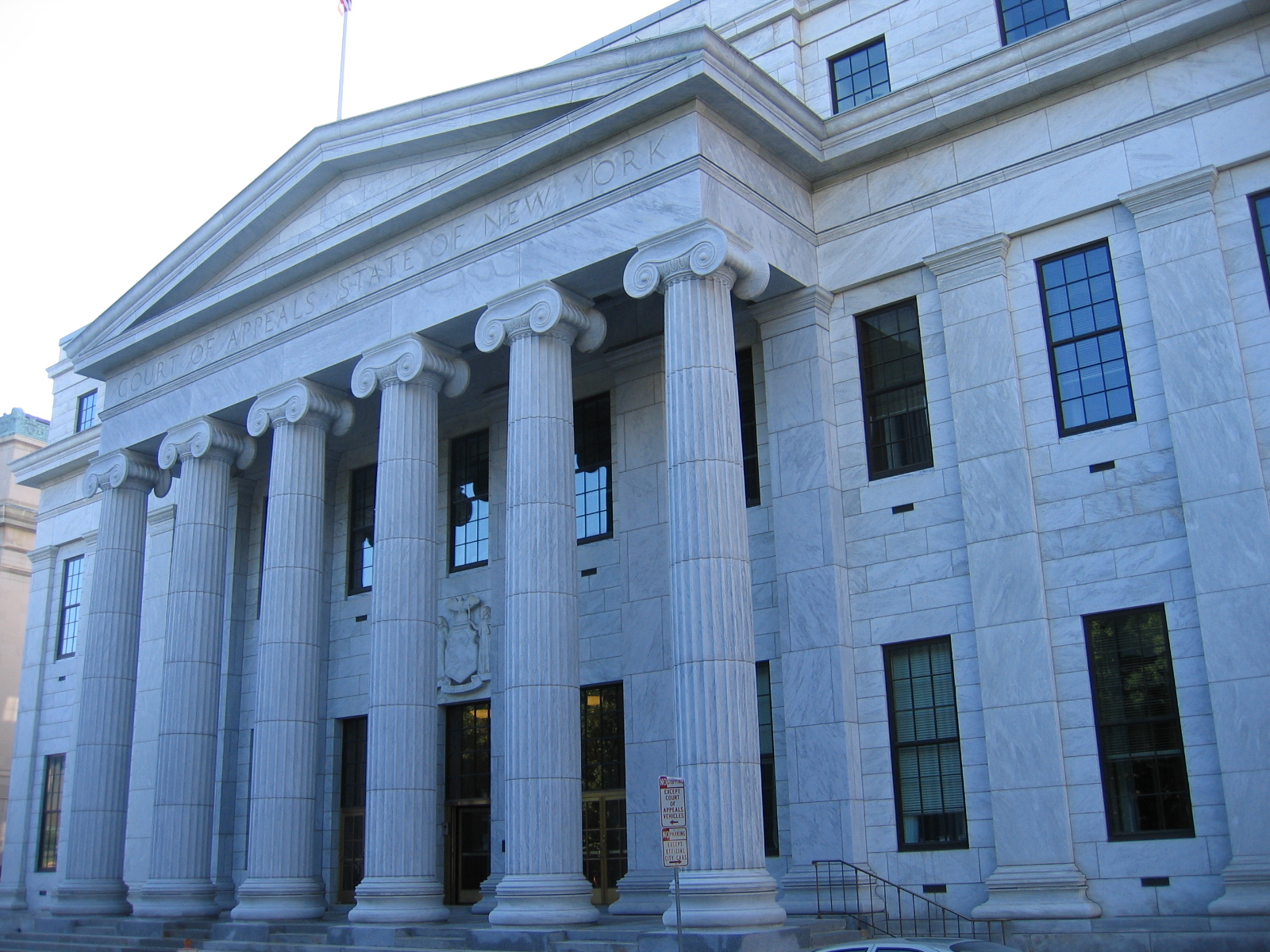
The New York Court of Appeals is the highest court of the New York judiciary

The highest court of appeal in the Unified Court System is the Court of Appeals whereas the primary felony trial court is the County Court (or the Supreme Court in New York City). The New York Supreme Court also acts as the intermediate appellate court for many cases, and the local courts handle a variety of other matters including small claims, traffic ticket cases, and local zoning matters, and are the starting point for all criminal cases.

The state is divided into counties, cities, towns, and villages, all of which are municipal corporations with respect to their own governments, as well as various corporate entities that serve single purposes that are also local governments, such as school districts, fire districts, and New York state public-benefit corporations, frequently known as authorities or development corporations. Each municipal corporation is granted varying home rule powers as provided by the New York Constitution. The state also has 10 Indian reservations. There have been several movements regarding secession from the state of New York. Proposals have included a state of Long Island, consisting of everything on the island outside New York City; a state called Niagara, the western counties of the state of New York; the northern counties of the state of New York called Upstate New York; making the city of New York a state; a proposal for a new Peconic County on eastern Long Island; and for the borough of Staten Island to secede from New York City.

In a 2020 study, New York was ranked as the 17th easiest state for citizens to vote in.

New York's government released a new seal, coat of arms, and flag in April 2020, adding "E pluribus unum" below the state's motto. A bill utilizing newly designed flag, arms and seal went into effect in September.

Revived in the early 2000s, Abolition Commemoration Day, also known as the Fifth of July, is a historic celebration commemorating the abolishment of slavery in New York. In July 2020, the New York State Assembly passed legislation officially recognizing Abolition Commemoration Day and Juneteenth in New York. Abolition Commemoration Day is observed on the second Monday in July and Juneteenth on June 19.

=== Federal representation ===
As of 2026, New York contains twenty-six congressional districts. New York lost a congressional district in 2023 due to the state's slower overall population growth relative to the overall national population growth. As of 2024, New York has 28 electoral votes in U.S. presidential elections.

== Politics ==
The State of New York is a blue state, or a state where Democratic Party candidates typically win elections.

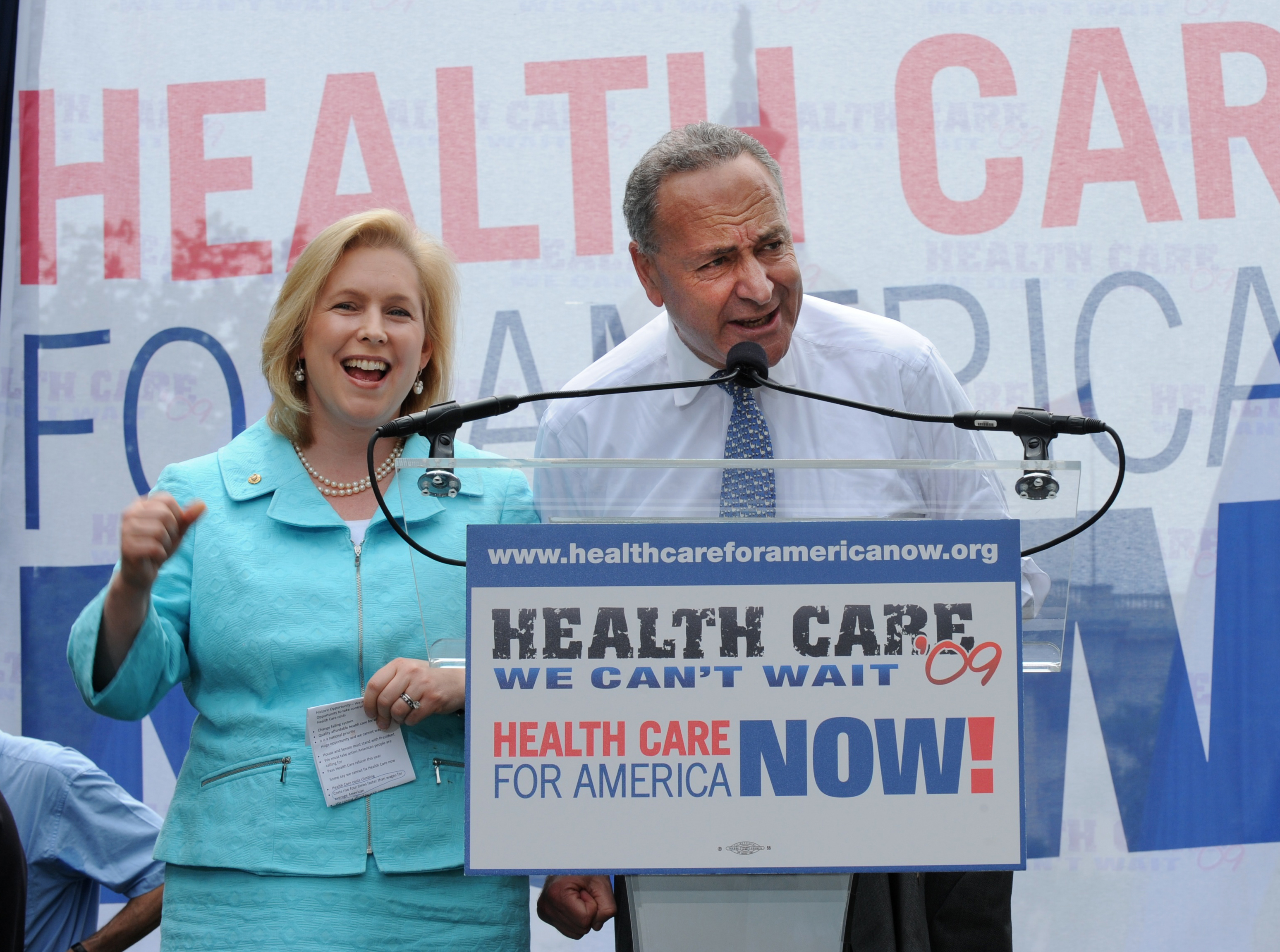
Kirsten Gillibrand and Chuck Schumer, the state's two U.S. Senators as of 2024

As of 2025, there are more than twice as many enrolled Democratic voters as there are enrolled Republican voters in New York. As of 2024, no Republican candidate had won a presidential election in New York since Ronald Reagan did so in 1984. As of 2025, no Republican candidate had won a statewide election in New York since George Pataki was re-elected governor in 2002.

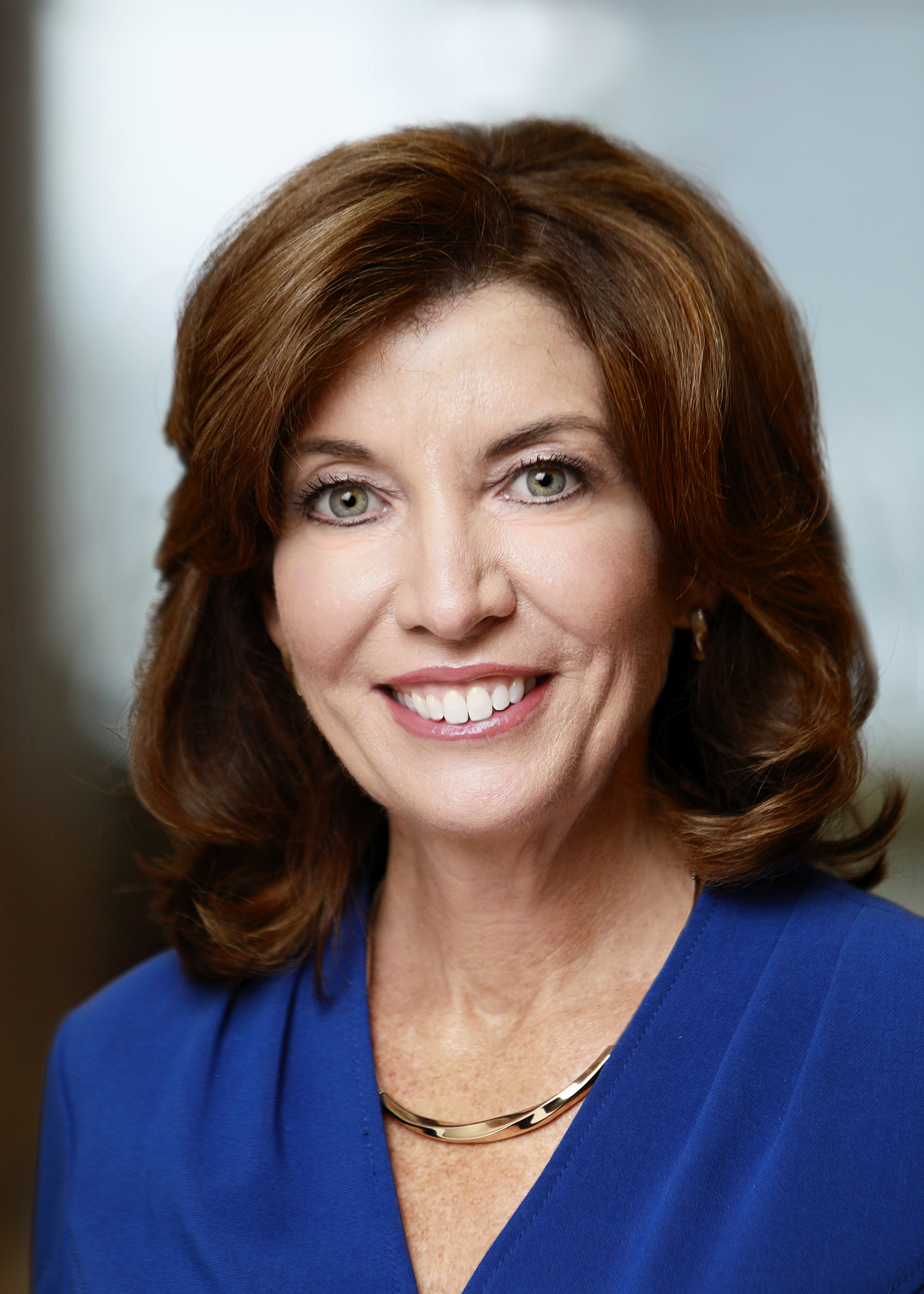
Kathy Hochul (D), the 57th Governor of New York

As of 2026, New York is represented by Chuck Schumer and Kirsten Gillibrand in the United States Senate and is represented by 19 Democrats and seven Republicans in the U.S. House of Representatives.

As of 2026, Democrat Kathy Hochul is the governor of New York, having served in that capacity since 2021; the New York State Senate has been led by the Democratic Party since 2019, and the New York State Assembly has been led by the Democrats since 1975.

New York City is an important center for international diplomacy. The United Nations headquarters has been situated on the East Side of Midtown Manhattan since 1952.

2024 presidential election in New York result by county. Democratic Republican

== Sports ==
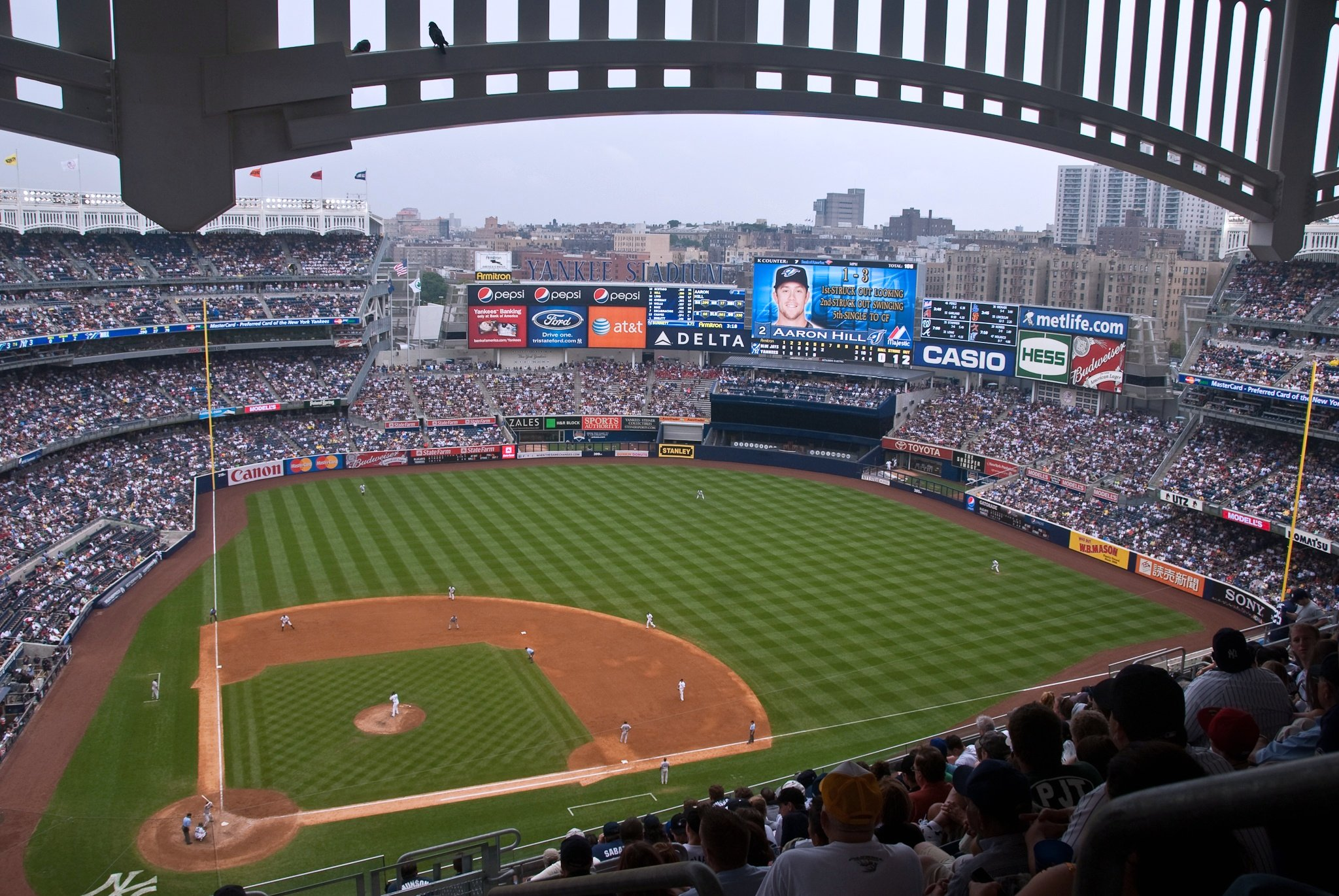
Yankee Stadium in The Bronx

The State of New York is represented by three National Football League teams, but is geographically home to one team, the Buffalo Bills, based in the Buffalo suburb of Orchard Park. The other two NFL teams representing New York, the New York Giants and New York Jets, also represent the New York City metropolitan area and were previously located in New York City, but they play in MetLife Stadium, located in East Rutherford, New Jersey, about seven miles west of New York City. New York also has two Major League Baseball teams, the New York Yankees (based in the Bronx) and the New York Mets (based in Queens). Minor league baseball teams also play in the State of New York, including the Long Island Ducks, the Staten Island FerryHawks, and the Brooklyn Cyclones, downstate, and the Rochester Red Wings, the Binghamton Rumble Ponies, the Syracuse Mets, the Auburn Doubledays, the Batavia Muckdogs, the Hudson Valley Renegades and the Buffalo Bisons upstate.

New York is home to three National Hockey League franchises: the New York Rangers in Manhattan, the New York Islanders in Nassau County on Long Island, and the Buffalo Sabres in Buffalo. New York is home to three American Hockey League franchises: the Rochester Americans, the Utica Comets, and the Syracuse Crunch. The Adirondack Thunder are the only ECHL franchise in New York. New York has two National Basketball Association teams, the New York Knicks in Manhattan, and the Brooklyn Nets in Brooklyn and a Women's National Basketball Association team, the New York Liberty, also based in Brooklyn. New York is the home of a Major League Soccer franchise, New York City FC, currently playing in the Bronx, though they are building a new stadium in Queens. Although the New York Red Bulls represent the New York City metropolitan area, they play in Sports Illustrated Stadium in Harrison, New Jersey.

Highmark Stadium in Orchard Park

New York hosted the 1932 and 1980 Winter Olympics at Lake Placid. The 1980 Games are known for the USA–USSR ice hockey match dubbed the "Miracle on Ice", in which a group of American college students and amateurs defeated the heavily favored Soviet national ice hockey team 4–3 and went on to win the gold medal against Finland. Along with St. Moritz, Switzerland and Innsbruck, Austria, Lake Placid is one of the three cities to have hosted the Winter Olympic Games twice. New York City bid for the 2012 Summer Olympics but lost to London. The annual United States Open Tennis Championships is one of the world's four Grand Slam tennis tournaments and is held at the National Tennis Center in Flushing Meadows–Corona Park in Queens. The Belmont Stakes, part of the Triple Crown of Thoroughbred Racing, is held at Belmont Park in Nassau County on Long Island.

Several U.S. national sports halls of fame are or have been situated in New York. The National Baseball Hall of Fame and Museum is located in Cooperstown, Otsego County. The National Museum of Racing and Hall of Fame in Saratoga Springs, Saratoga County, honors achievements in the sport of thoroughbred horse racing. The physical facility of the National Soccer Hall of Fame in Oneonta, also in Otsego County, closed in 2010, although the organization itself has continued inductions.

The state of New York is also home to many intercollegiate division 1 sports programs. The State University of New York's flagship University at Buffalo are the Buffalo Bulls. Syracuse University's intercollegiate teams are the Syracuse Orange.

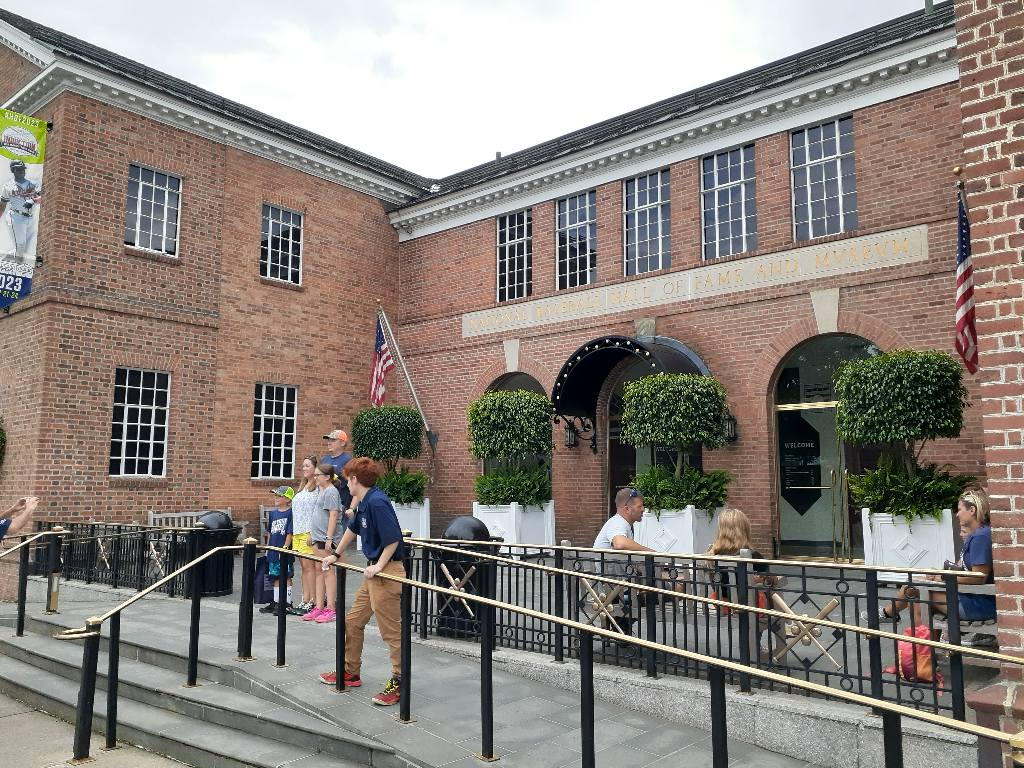
The National Baseball Hall of Fame in Cooperstown, NY

New York (state) major league professional sports teams
Club	Sport	League
Buffalo Bills	Football	National Football League
New York Giants (de jure)	Football	National Football League
New York Jets (de jure)	Football	National Football League
Brooklyn Nets	Basketball	National Basketball Association
New York Knicks	Basketball	National Basketball Association
New York Liberty	Basketball	Women's National Basketball Association
New York City FC	Soccer	Major League Soccer
New York Red Bulls (de jure)	Soccer	Major League Soccer
Buffalo Sabres	Ice hockey	National Hockey League
New York Islanders	Ice hockey	National Hockey League
New York Rangers	Ice hockey	National Hockey League
New York Mets	Baseball	Major League Baseball
New York Yankees	Baseball	Major League Baseball

== See also ==
- Index of New York (state)-related articles
- Outline of New York
- List of New York area codes
