= Index of New York (state)–related articles =

The location of the State of New York in the United States of America

The following is an alphabetical list of articles related to the U.S. State of New York.

== 0–9 ==
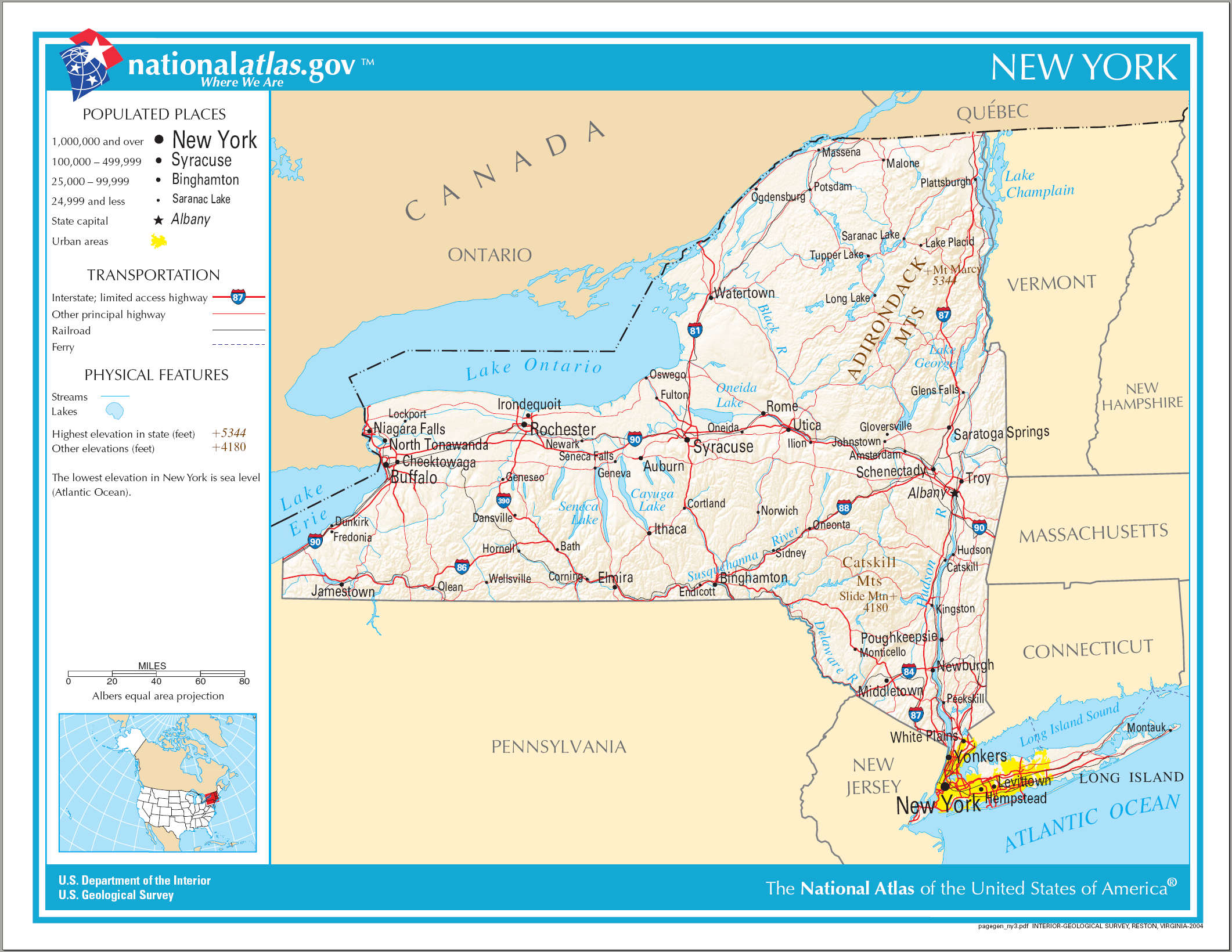
An enlargeable map of the State of New York

- .ny.us – Internet second-level domain for the state of New York
- 11th State to ratify the United States Constitution

== A ==
- Abortion in New York
- Adjacent states and provinces:
  - Commonwealth of Massachusetts
  - Commonwealth of Pennsylvania
  - Province de Québec
  - Province of Ontario
  - State of Connecticut
  - State of New Jersey
  - State of Vermont
- Agriculture in New York
- Airports in New York
- Albany, New York, state capital since 1797
- Alcohol laws of New York
- Amusement parks in New York (state)
- Aquaria in New York (state)
  - commons:Category:Aquaria in New York
- Arboreta in New York (state)
  - commons:Category:Arboreta in New York
- Archaeology of New York
  - Category:Archaeological sites in New York (state)
    - commons:Category:Archaeological sites in New York
- Architecture of New York
- Art museums and galleries in New York (state)
  - commons:Category:Art museums and galleries in New York
- Area codes in New York
- Astronomical observatories in New York (state)
  - commons:Category:Astronomical observatories in New York
- Attorney General of the State of New York

== B ==
- Beaches of New York (state)
  - commons:Category:Beaches of New York
- Belmont Park
  - Belmont Stakes
- Binghamton, NY
- Botanical gardens in New York (state)
  - commons:Category:Botanical gardens in New York
- Buffalo, New York
- Buildings and structures in New York (state)
  - commons:Category:Buildings and structures in New York

== C ==
The New York State Capitol in Albany

An enlargeable map of the 62 counties of the State of New York

- Capital of the State of New York
- Capitol of the State of New York
  - commons:Category:New York State Capitol
- Casinos in New York (state)
- Caves of New York (state)
  - commons:Category:Caves of New York
- Census statistical areas of New York
- Cities in New York
  - commons:Category:Cities in New York
- Climate of New York
- Colleges and universities in New York
  - commons:Category:Universities and colleges in New York
- Communications in New York (state)
  - commons:Category:Communications in New York
- Companies in New York
  - Category:Companies based in New York (state)
- Congressional districts of New York
- Constitution of the State of New York
- Convention centers in New York (state)
  - commons:Category:Convention centers in New York
- Counties of the State of New York
  - commons:Category:Counties in New York
- County highway routes in New York
- Crime in New York
- Culture of New York
  - commons:Category:New York culture

== D ==
- Demographics of New York
  - Category:Demographics of New York (state)

== E ==
- Economy of New York
  - Category:Economy of New York (state)
    - commons:Category:Economy of New York (state)
- Education in New York
  - Category:Education in New York (state)
    - commons:Category:Education in New York (state)
- Eimatai Leadership Development Project
- Elections in New York (state)
  - Category:Elections in New York (state)
    - commons:Category:Elections in New York (state)
- Category:Environment of New York (state)
  - commons:Category:Environment of New York (state)

== F ==
- Fildwith Ensemble Theatre

The Flag of the State of New York

- Festivals in New York (state)
  - commons:Category:Festivals in New York (state)
- Finger Lakes
- Flag of the State of New York
- Forts in New York
  - Fort Amsterdam, capital of Nieuw-Nederland 1625-1664
  - Category:Forts in New York (state)
    - commons:Category:Forts in New York

== G ==
The Great Seal of the State of New York

- Gardens in New York (state)
  - commons:Category:Gardens in New York
- Genesee Valley Regional Market Authority
- Geography of New York
  - Category:Geography of New York (state)
    - commons:Category:Geography of New York
- Geology of New York (state)
  - commons:Category:Geology of New York
- German Reform Movement (New York City, 1800s)
- Ghost towns in New York
  - Category:Ghost towns in New York (state)
    - commons:Category:Ghost towns in New York
- Golf clubs and courses in New York (state)
- Government of the State of New York website
  - Category:Government of New York (state)
    - commons:Category:Government of New York
- Governor of the State of New York
  - List of governors of New York
- Great Seal of the State of New York

== H ==
- Heritage railroads in New York (state)
  - commons:Category:Heritage railroads in New York
- High schools of New York State
- Higher education in New York
- Highway routes in New York
- Hiking trails in New York (state)
  - commons:Category:Hiking trails in New York
- History of New York
  - Historical outline of New York
- Hospitals in New York
- Hudson River
- Hurley, New York, state capital 1777

== I ==
- Images of New York (state)
  - commons:Category:New York
- Interstate highway routes in New York

== J ==
- Joseph T St Lawrence Center

== K ==
- Kingston, New York, state capital 1777

== L ==
- Lakes in New York
  - Finger Lakes
  - Lake Champlain
  - Lake Erie
  - Lake Ontario
  - Category:Lakes of New York (state)
    - commons:Category:Lakes of New York
- Landmarks in New York (state)
  - commons:Category:Landmarks in New York
- Lieutenant Governor of the State of New York
- Lists related to the State of New York:
  - List of airports in New York
  - List of census-designated places in New York
  - List of census statistical areas in New York
  - List of cities in New York
  - List of colleges and universities in New York
  - List of companies in New York
  - List of counties in New York
  - List of county highway routes in New York
  - List of films set in New York City
  - List of forts in New York
  - List of ghost towns in New York
  - List of governors of New York
  - List of high schools in New York (state)
  - List of highway routes in New York
  - List of hospitals in New York
  - List of individuals executed in New York
  - List of Interstate highway routes in New York
  - List of lakes in New York
  - List of law enforcement agencies in New York
  - List of museums in New York
  - List of National Historic Landmarks in New York
  - List of New York's congressional delegations
  - List of New York's congressional districts
  - List of newspapers in New York
  - List of people from New York
  - List of places in New York
  - List of radio stations in New York
  - List of railroads in New York
  - List of Registered Historic Places in New York
  - List of rivers of New York
  - List of school districts in New York
  - List of sister cities in New York
  - List of state forests in New York
  - List of state highway routes in New York
  - List of state reference routes and parkway routes in New York
  - List of state parks in New York
  - List of state prisons in New York
  - List of symbols of the State of New York
  - List of telephone area codes in New York
  - List of television stations in New York
  - List of towns in New York
  - List of United States representatives from New York
  - List of United States senators from New York
  - List of U.S. highway routes in New York

== M ==
- Maps of New York (state)
  - commons:Category:Maps of New York
- Mass media in New York
- Monuments and memorials in New York (state)
  - commons:Category:Monuments and memorials in New York
- Mountains of New York
  - commons:Category:Mountains of New York
- Museums in New York
  - Category:Museums in New York (state)
    - commons:Category:Museums in New York
- Music of New York
  - commons:Category:Music of New York
  - Category:Musical groups from New York (state)
  - Category:Musicians from New York (state)

== N ==
- National forests of New York (state)
  - commons:Category:National Forests of New York
- Natural history of New York (state)
  - commons:Category:Natural history of New York
- Nature centers in New York (state)
  - commons:Category:Nature centers in New York
- New York website
  - Category:New York (state)
    - commons:Category:New York
      - commons:Category:Maps of New York
- New York Area Theological Library Association
- New York Bill of Rights
- New York City AIDS Memorial
- New York City Employment and Training Coalition
- New York City Science and Engineering Fair
- New York City tugboat strike of 1946
- New-York later New York City; colonial capital 1664–1673, 1674–1688, and 1689–1776; state capital 1776-1777 and 1788–1797; national capital 1785-1788 and 1789–1790
- New York International Arbitration Center (NYIAC)
- New York-Newark-Bridgeport, NY-NJ-CT-PA Combined Statistical Area
- New York-Northern New Jersey-Long Island, NY-NJ-PA Metropolitan Statistical Area
- New York Philanthropic Advisory Service
- New York Policy Forum
- New York Smash
- New York State Capitol
- New York State Dental Foundation
- New York State Office for the Prevention of Domestic Violence
- New York State Thruway
- Newspapers of New York
- Niagara Falls
- Nieuw-Amsterdam, capital of Nieuw-Nederland 1625-1652
- Nieuw-Nederland, 1625–1664 and 1673–1674
- Nieuw-Oranje, capital of Nieuw-Nederland 1673-1674
- NY – United States Postal Service postal code for the State of New York

== O ==
- [[:|Outdoor sculptures in New York (state)]]
  - commons:Category:Outdoor sculptures in New York

== P ==
- People from New York
  - Category:People from New York (state)
    - commons:Category:People from New York
    - Category:People from New York (state) by populated place
    - Category:People from New York (state) by county
    - Category:People from New York (state) by occupation
- Places in New York
- Politics of New York
  - Category:Politics of New York (state)
    - commons:Category:Politics of New York
- Protected areas of New York (state)
  - commons:Category:Protected areas of New York
- Province of New-York, 1664–1673, 1674–1688, 1689–1776
- Poughkeepsie, New York, state capital 1777-1788

== Q ==
- Queens (borough)

== R ==
- Radio stations in New York
- Railroad museums in New York (state)
  - commons:Category:Railroad museums in New York
- Railroads in New York
- Registered historic places in New York
  - commons:Category:Registered Historic Places in New York
- Religion in New York
  - Category:Religion in New York (state)
    - commons:Category:Religion in New York
- Rivers of New York
  - commons:Category:Rivers of New York
- Rock formations in New York (state)
  - commons:Category:Rock formations in New York
- Roller coasters in New York (state)
  - commons:Category:Roller coasters in New York

== S ==
- School districts of New York
- Scouting in New York
- Populated places in New York (state)
  - Cities in New York (state)
  - Towns in New York (state)
  - Villages in New York (state)
  - Census Designated Places in New York (state)
  - Other unincorporated communities in New York (state)
  - List of ghost towns in New York
  - List of places in New York
- Sister cities in New York
- Ski areas and resorts in New York (state)
  - commons:Category:Ski areas and resorts in New York
- Sports in New York
  - Category:Sports in New York (state)
    - commons:Category:Sports in New York
  - Category:Sports venues in New York (state)
    - commons:Category:Sports venues in New York
- State Assembly of New York
- State Capitol of New York
- State highway routes in New York
- State of New York
  - Constitution of the State of New York
  - Government of the State of New York
    - Category:Government of New York (state)
      - commons:Category:Government of New York
  - Executive branch of the government of the State of New York
    - Governor of the State of New York
  - Legislative branch of the government of the State of New York
    - Legislature of the State of New York
      - State Senate of New York
      - State Assembly of New York
  - Judicial branch of the government of the State of New York
    - Supreme Court of the State of New York
- State parks of New York
  - commons:Category:State parks of New York
- State parkway routes in New York
- State prisons of New York
- State reference routes in New York
- State Senate of New York
- Structures in New York (state)
  - commons:Category:Buildings and structures in New York
- Superfund sites in New York
- Supreme Court of the State of New York
- Susquehanna River
- Symbols of the State of New York
  - Category:Symbols of New York (state)
    - commons:Category:Symbols of New York

== T ==
- Telecommunications in New York (state)
  - commons:Category:Communications in New York
- Telephone area codes in New York
- Television shows set in New York (state)
- Television stations in New York
- Theatres in New York (state)
  - commons:Category:Theatres in New York
- Tourism in New York (state) website
  - commons:Category:Tourism in New York
- Towns in New York
  - commons:Category:Cities in New York
- Transportation in New York
  - Category:Transportation in New York (state)
    - commons:Category:Transport in New York
- Triple Crown of Thoroughbred Racing

== U ==
- United States of America
  - States of the United States of America
  - New York's congressional delegations
  - New York's congressional districts
  - United States census statistical areas of New York
  - United States Court of Appeals for the Second Circuit
  - United States District Court for the Eastern District of New York
  - United States District Court for the Northern District of New York
  - United States District Court for the Southern District of New York
  - United States District Court for the Western District of New York
  - United States representatives from New York
  - United States senators from New York
- Universities and colleges in New York
  - commons:Category:Universities and colleges in New York
- Upstate New York
- U.S. highway routes in New York
- US-NY – ISO 3166-2:US region code for the State of New York

== W ==
- Water parks in New York (state)
- Waterfalls of New York (state)
  - commons:Category:Waterfalls of New York
  Wikimedia
  - Wikimedia Commons:Category:New York
    - commons:Category:Maps of New York
  - Wikinews:Category:New York
    - Wikinews:Portal:New York
  - Wikipedia Category:New York
    - Wikipedia Portal:New York (state)
    - Wikipedia:WikiProject New York (state)
      - Wikipedia:WikiProject New York (state)#Articles
      - Wikipedia:WikiProject New York (state)#Members

== Z ==
- Zoos in New York (state)
  - commons:Category:Zoos in New York

== See also ==
- Topic overview:
  - New York
  - Outline of New York
  - Bibliography of New York
