= Area code 401 =

Area code for Rhode Island

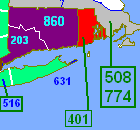

Area code 401 is the telephone area code in the North American Numbering Plan (NANP) for the U.S. state of Rhode Island. 401 is one of the original North American area codes, which were established in 1947.

Area code 401 is not projected to exhaust its supply of vacant central office codes until 2055.

Rhode Island area codes: 401
	North: 508/774	
West: 860/959	401	East: 508/774
	South: 631/934	
Connecticut area codes: 203/475, 860/959
Massachusetts area codes: 413, 508/774, 617/857, 781/339, 978/351
New York area codes: 212/332/646, 315/680, 363/516, 518/838, 585, 607, 631/934, 624/716, 347/718/929, 329/845, 914, 917
