= Area codes 860 and 959 =

Area codes in Connecticut

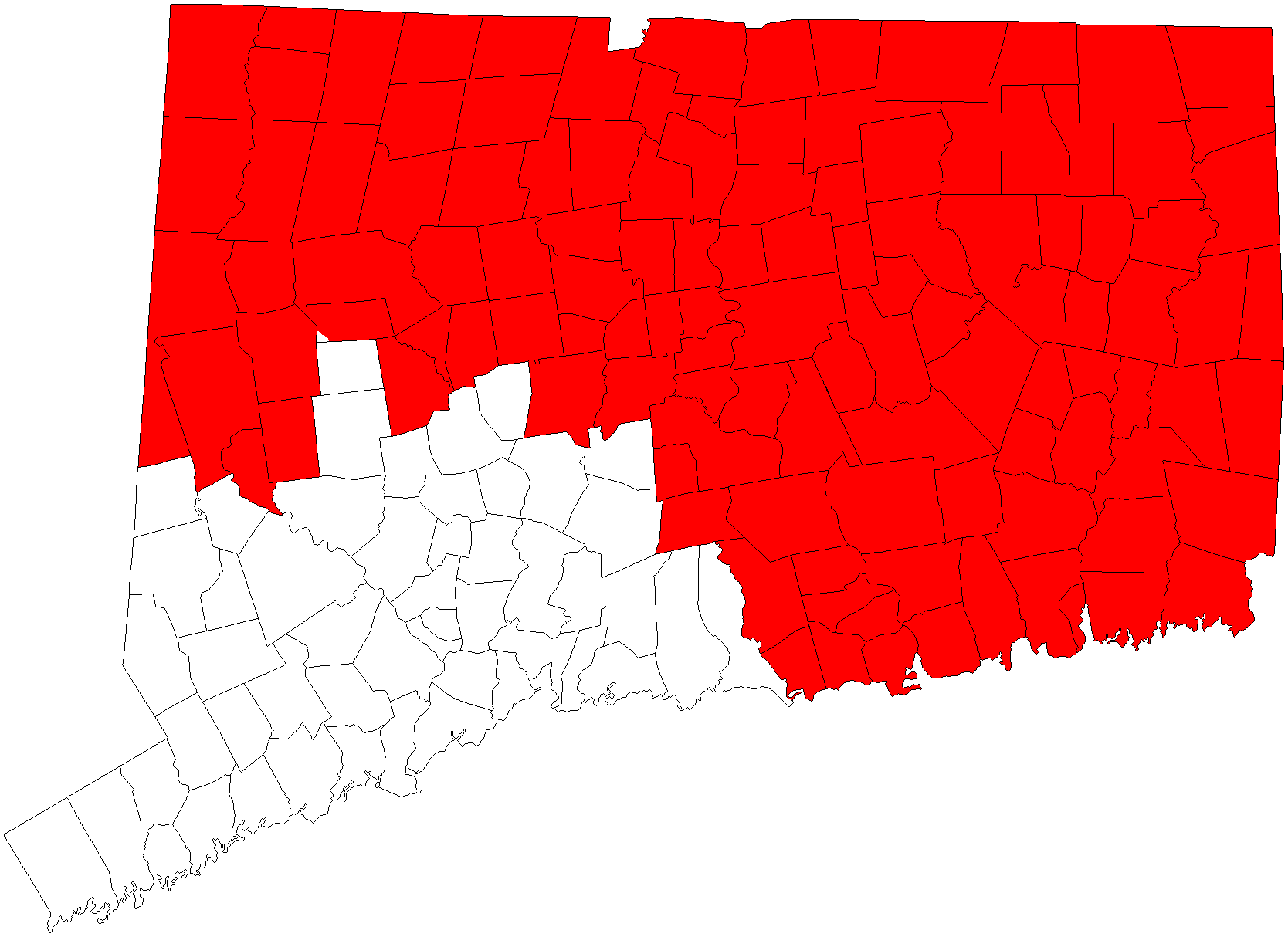
Connecticut state map with area codes 860 and 959 in red

Area codes 860 and 959 are telephone area codes in the North American Numbering Plan for the U.S. state of Connecticut. They are arranged in an overlay complex for a numbering plan area (NPA) that comprises most of the state, except its southwest, which uses area codes 203 and 475.

== History ==
The state of Connecticut was a single numbering plan area in the first nationwide telephone numbering plan of 1947. It was designated with area code 203, a configuration that remained in place for 48 years.

Due to the growth of telecommunication services from mobile devices and fax machines in the 1990s, the service area was divided in an area code split on August 28, 1995 to create more central offices. The numbering plan area was reduced to Fairfield County (except for Sherman) and New Haven County, plus part of Litchfield County (Bethlehem, Woodbury, and a small part of Roxbury). The remainder of the state received the new area code 860. Dialing of the code became mandatory on October 4, 1996, after a permissive dialing period for customer education.

By 1999, growth had not slowed and the Connecticut Department of Public Utility Control announced a new area code, 959, in August 1999, to overlay 860, but implementation was delayed for over a decade because of alternate telephone number allocation methods. In September 2008, the overlay was scheduled within two years. In March 2009, the 860/959 overlay was anticipated by 2011. Even though the in-service date for area code 959 was not fixed, ten-digit dialing was required by November 14, 2009.

On August 27, 2013, the NANPA issued Planning Letter 456 which announced an in-service date for 959 of August 30, 2014.

== Service area ==
The numbering plan area includes the following major cities and towns.

- Bloomfield
- Bristol
- East Hartford
- East Lyme
- Enfield
- Glastonbury
- Groton
- Hartford
- Litchfield
- Manchester
- Middletown
- New Britain
- New London
- New Milford
- Norwich
- Old Lyme
- Sherman
- Southington
- Storrs
- Stonington
- Torrington
- West Hartford
- Willimantic
- Windsor

== See also ==
- List of Connecticut area codes
- List of North American Numbering Plan area codes

Connecticut area codes: 203/475, 860/959
	North: 413, 508/774	
West: 518/838, 845/329	860/959	East: 401
	South: 203/475, 631/934	
Massachusetts area codes: 413, 508/774, 617/857, 781/339, 978/351
New York area codes: 212/332/646, 315/680, 363/516, 518/838, 585, 607, 631/934, 624/716, 347/718/929, 329/845, 914, 917
Rhode Island area codes: 401
