= New York History =

New York History may refer to:

- History of New York City
- History of New York (state)
- New York History, an academic journal associated with the New York State Museum
