= Outline of New York (state) =

Overview of and topical guide to New York

The flag of New York

The seal of New York

The location of the State of New York in the United States of America

The following outline is provided as an overview of and topical guide to the U.S. State of New York:

New York – U.S. state located on the Eastern seaboard and extending to the Great Lakes. Settled by the Dutch in the 17th century, New York was one of the original Thirteen Colonies. About one third of all the battles of the Revolutionary War took place in New York. New York enacted its constitution in 1777 and was the eleventh state to ratify the United States Constitution, on July 26, 1788. It is the fourth most populous state.

== General reference ==
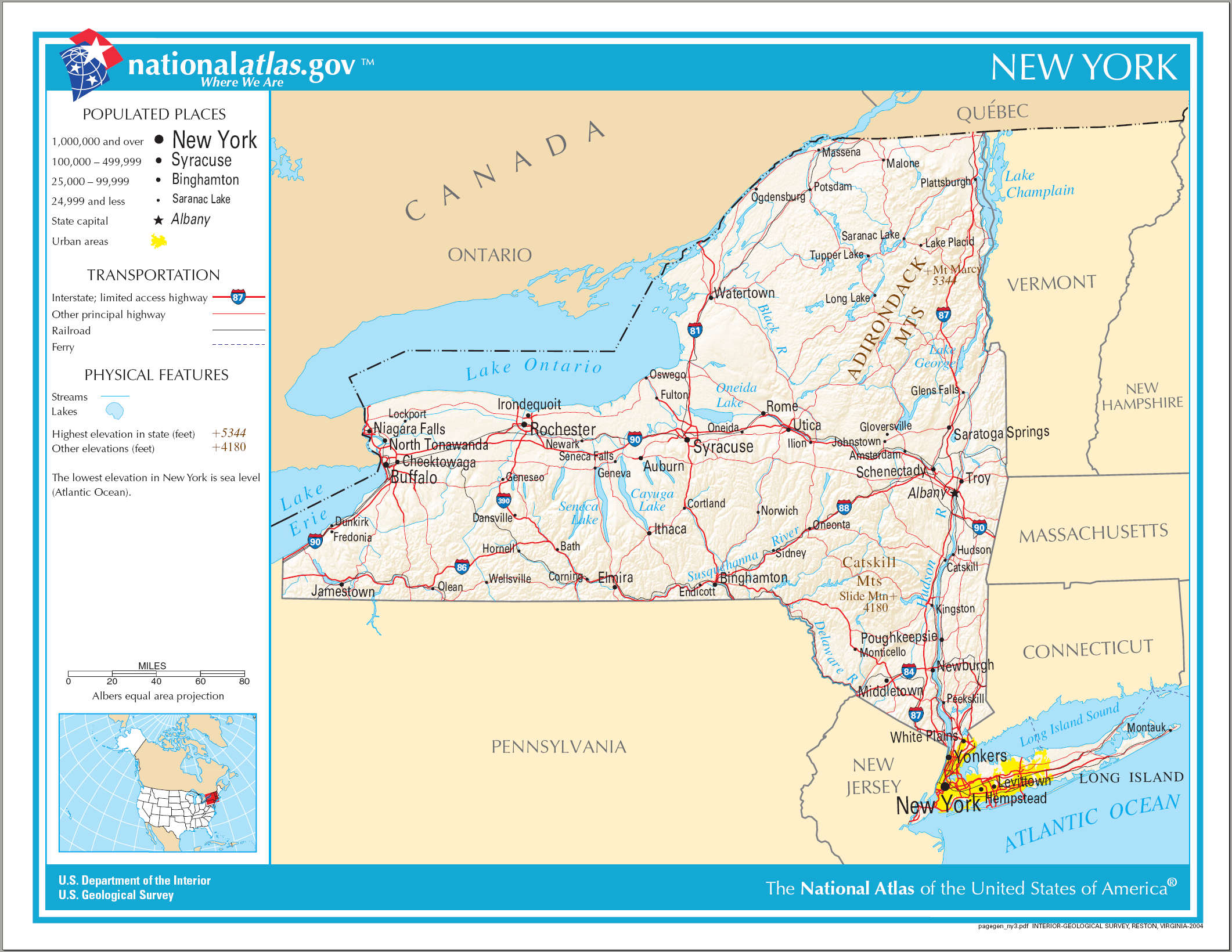
An enlargeable map of the State of New York

- Names
  - Common name: New York
  - Official name: State of New York
  - Abbreviations and name codes
  - Postal symbol: NY
  - ISO 3166-2 code: US-NY
  - Internet second-level domain: .ny.us
  - Nicknames
    - The Empire State (currently used on license plates)
- Adjectival: New York
- Demonym: New Yorker

== Geography of New York ==
Geography of New York

- New York is: a U.S. state, a federal state of the United States of America
- Location
  - Northern Hemisphere
  - Western Hemisphere
    - Americas
      - North America
        - Anglo America
        - Northern America
          - United States of America
            - Contiguous United States
              - Canada–US border
              - Eastern United States
                - East Coast of the United States
                  - Northeastern United States
                    - Mid-Atlantic states
          - Great Lakes Region
- Population of New York: 19,378,102 (2010 U.S. Census)
- Area of New York: 54,555 sq mi (141,298 km^{2})
- Atlas of New York
- Places in New York
  - National Historic Landmarks in New York
  - National Register of Historic Places listings in New York
    - Bridges on the National Register of Historic Places in New York
  - National Natural Landmarks in New York
  - State parks in New York

=== Environment of New York ===
- Climate of New York
- State forests of New York
- Superfund sites in New York

==== Natural geographic features of New York ====
- Lakes of New York
- Rivers of New York

=== Regions of New York ===
Economic regions of New York

- Downstate New York
  - New York City
  - Long Island
  - Hudson Valley
- Upstate New York
  - Capital District
  - North Country
  - Southern Tier
  - Central New York
  - Western New York

==== Administrative divisions of New York ====
An enlargeable map of the 62 counties of the State of New York

- Counties in New York
  - Cities in New York
    - State capital of New York: Albany
    - City nicknames in New York
    - Sister cities in New York
  - Towns in New York
- Census-designated places in New York

=== Demography of New York ===
Demographics of New York

== Government and politics of New York ==
- Form of government: U.S. state government
- New York's congressional delegations
- New York State Capitol
- Elections in New York
  - Electoral reform in New York
- Political party strength in New York

=== Executive branch of the government of New York ===
- Governor of New York
  - Lieutenant Governor of New York
  - Secretary of State of New York
- State departments
  - New York State Department of Transportation

=== Legislative branch of the government of New York ===
- New York Legislature (bicameral)
  - Upper house: New York State Senate
  - Lower house: New York State Assembly

=== Judicial branch of the government of New York ===
Courts of New York

- Supreme Court of New York

=== Law and order in New York ===
Law of New York

- Cannabis in New York
- Capital punishment in New York
  - Individuals executed in New York
- Constitution of New York
- Crime in New York
- Gun laws in New York
- Law enforcement in New York
  - Law enforcement agencies in New York
    - New York State Police
- Same-sex marriage in New York

=== Military of New York ===
- New York Air National Guard
- New York Army National Guard

=== Local government in New York ===
Local government in New York

== History of New York ==
History of New York

=== History of New York by period ===
- French colony of Canada, 1534–(1609–1763)
- Dutch colony of Nieuw-Nederland, 1624–1652
  - History of slavery in New York, 1626–1827
- Patroonship of Rensselaerswyck, 1630–1840s
- Dutch province of Nieuw-Nederland, 1652–1664
- English Province of New-York, 1664–1673
- Third Anglo-Dutch War, 1672–1674
  - Netherlands military government of Nieuw-Nederland, 1673–1674
  - Treaty of Westminster of 1674
- English Province of New-York, 1674–1688
- English Dominion of New-England in America, 1688–1689
- English Province of New-York, 1689–1707
- British Province of New-York, 1707–1776
- King George's War, 1740–1748
  - Treaty of Aix-la-Chapelle of 1748
- French and Indian War, 1754–1763
  - Treaty of Paris of 1763
- British Indian Reserve, 1763–1783
  - Royal Proclamation of 1763
- American Revolutionary War, April 19, 1775 – September 3, 1783
  - Capture of Fort Ticonderoga, May 10, 1775
  - New York and New Jersey campaign, July 3, 1776 – July 26, 1777
  - United States Declaration of Independence, July 4, 1776
  - Saratoga campaign, June 14 – October 17, 1777
    - Siege of Fort Ticonderoga, July 2–6, 1777
    - Battles of Saratoga, September 19 – October 7, 1777
  - Treaty of Paris, September 3, 1783
- State of New York since 1776
    - Third state to ratify the Articles of Confederation and Perpetual Union, signed July 9, 1778
  - Western territorial claims ceded 1782
  - Eleventh State to ratify the Constitution of the United States of America on July 26, 1788
  - War of 1812, June 18, 1812 – March 23, 1815
    - Battle of Plattsburgh, 1814
    - Treaty of Ghent, December 24, 1814
  - Martin Van Buren becomes 8th President of the United States on March 4, 1837
  - Mexican–American War, April 25, 1846 – February 2, 1848
  - Millard Fillmore becomes 13th President of the United States on July 9, 1850
  - American Civil War, April 12, 1861 – May 13, 1865
    - New York in the American Civil War, 1861–1865
  - Chester A. Arthur becomes 21st President of the United States on September 19, 1881
  - Grover Cleveland becomes 22nd President of the United States on March 4, 1885
  - Grover Cleveland also becomes 24th President of the United States on March 4, 1893
  - Spanish–American War, April 25 – August 12, 1898
  - Assassination of President William McKinley in Buffalo on September 6, 1901
    - President McKinley dies in Buffalo on September 14, 1901
    - Vice President (and former Governor) Theodore Roosevelt becomes 26th President of the United States on September 14, 1901
  - Former Governor Franklin Delano Roosevelt becomes 32nd President of the United States on March 4, 1933

== History of New York by region ==
- By city
  - History of New York City
  - History of Buffalo, New York

== History of New York by subject ==
- History of slavery in New York

== Culture of New York ==
- Museums in New York
- Religion in New York
  - The Church of Jesus Christ of Latter-day Saints in New York
  - Episcopal Diocese of New York
- Scouting in New York
- State symbols of New York
  - Flag of the State of New York (New York (state))
  - Great Seal of the State of New York

=== The Arts in New York ===
- Music of New York
- Theater in New York

=== Sports in New York ===
Sports in New York

== Economy and infrastructure of New York ==
Economy of New York

- Media:
  - Newspapers in New York
  - Radio stations in New York
  - Television stations in New York
- Hospitals in New York
- Transportation in New York
  - Airports in New York
  - Roads in New York
    - Interstate Highways in New York
    - State highways in New York

== Education in New York ==
Education in New York

- Schools in New York
  - School districts in New York
    - High schools in New York
  - Colleges and universities in New York
    - University of the State of New York
    - State University of New York

== See also ==
- Bibliography of New York
- Topic overview:
  - New York
  - Index of New York-related articles
  - Bibliography of New York
