= German Reform Movement =

The German Reform Movement may refer to:

- The Protestant Reformation, a 16th-century Christian movement started by the German monk, Martin Luther
- German Reform Movement (New York City, 1800s), a local political association in late 19th century New York City
- Seventh Day Adventist Reform Movement, also known as "German Reform movement"
- German-Jewish Reform Movement, a phase in the history of Reform Judaism
