= Area codes 631 and 934 =

Area codes in Suffolk County, New York

Coordinates: 40.84°N 73.00°W

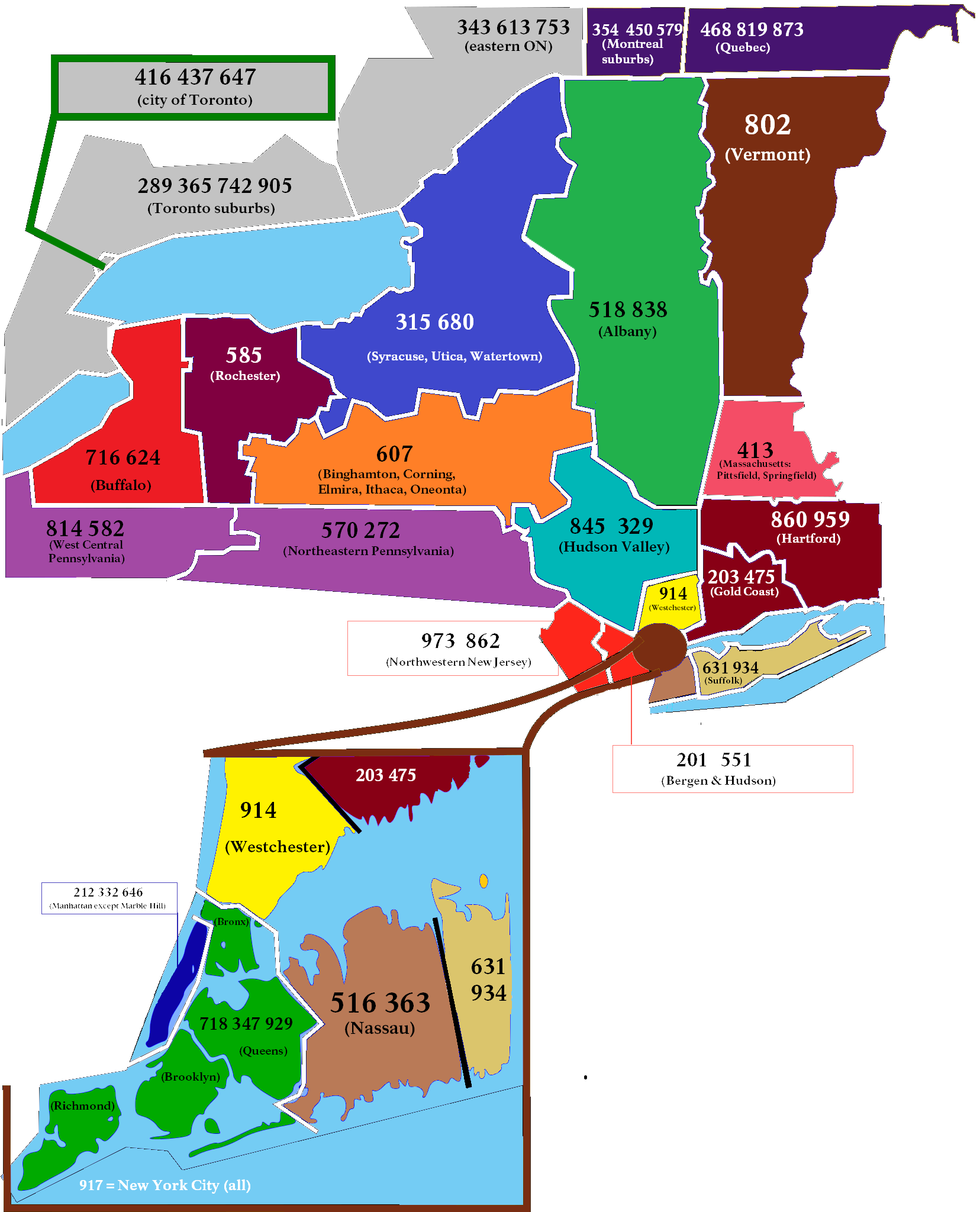
Area codes in New York state; area codes 631 and 934 highlighted in darker yellow

Area codes 631 and 934 are the telephone area codes in the North American Numbering Plan (NANP) for Suffolk County, New York, on Long Island. Area code 631 was created in 1999 in a split of 516 and 934 was added as an overlay in 2016. Communities in the numbering plan area include Babylon, Huntington, Islip, Smithtown, Brookhaven, Riverhead, Southampton, Southold, Shelter Island, and East Hampton.

== History ==
=== 1947–1951: 914 ===
With the announcement of a new nationwide telephone numbering plan by the American Telephone and Telegraph Company (AT&T) in October 1947, Suffolk County, Nassau County, the lower Hudson Valley, and some areas adjacent were assigned area code 914.

=== 1951–1999: 516 ===
During 1951, area code 516 was assigned to Suffolk and Nassau.

=== 1999–2016: 631 ===
On November 1, 1999, area code 631 was created solely for Suffolk County to satisfy the increased need for telephone numbers mainly due to cellular services, while Nassau County retained area code 516. Permissive dialing for numbers terminating in the 631 area across Long Island continued until April 1, 2000, during which both area code may be used to dial destinations in the 631 area. New central office codes in the new NPA could be activated as early as May 8, 2000.

=== 2016–present: 631/934 overlay ===
On July 16, 2016, area code 934 was assigned to overlay 631, which was nearing depletion of central office codes. This was the first overlay in an area in the state of New York outside New York City, and required ten-digit dialing for both area codes, effective June 18, 2016.

== See also ==
- List of New York area codes
- List of North American Numbering Plan area codes

New York area codes: 212/332/646, 315/680, 363/516, 518/838, 585, 607, 631/934, 624/716, 347/718/929, 329/845, 914, 917
	North: 203/475, 401, 860/959	
West: 363/516	631/934	East: Atlantic Ocean
	South: Atlantic Ocean	
Connecticut area codes: 203/475, 860/959
Rhode Island area codes: 401
