= New York City Employment and Training Coalition =

The New York City Employment and Training Coalition is an organization of workforce development and training providers based in New York City. Members include community-based organizations, community colleges, unions and government agencies. Seeking to serve as the primary connection point for a fragmented workforce development system, it advocates for effective workforce development policies, adequate program funding and effective use of federal stimulus dollars. NYCETC also works to sustain an environment that supports a high quality workforce development system to meet the changing needs of New Yorkers. NYCETC connects its members to policy makers, employers, best practices, and more through its forums, conferences and other outreach efforts. NYCETC is also a key resource for news, analysis, and information through its flagship publication, NYC Workforce Weekly, read by nearly 4,000 people a week.
