= New York Philanthropic Advisory Service =

The Charity Accountability Program is a program of the Education & Research Foundation of the Metropolitan New York Better Business Bureau which serves New York City, Long Island and the Mid-Hudson Region. Founded in 1986, it was previously known as the New York Philanthropic Advisory Service (NYPAS).

The mission of NYPAS is to promote public confidence in local charities and encourage charitable giving. It aims to provide the public with information on specific charities and giving practices, and to advise charities on how to meet and maintain ethical standards of operation. NYPAS produces reports on New York charities, using the Better Business Bureau's Standards for Charity Accountability. These standards focus on four areas of nonprofit management: Governance, Measuring Effectiveness, Finances, and Fundraising & Informational Materials.

Based on financial statements, tax filings, annual reports, and other materials, NYPAS determines whether a charity meets the Standards. The report produced is then published online in the New York Giving Guide. The reports are confined to areas of a charity's operation that can be quantitatively assessed.
