= New York Smash =

American lifestyle magazine

New York Smash is a regional magazine that primarily targets affluent residents and visitors of New York City, the Hamptons and the North Shore of Long Island. The headquarters is in Edgewater, New Jersey.

== History and profile ==
New York Smash was established in 2009. The magazine is published eight times annually. The magazine covers society events, travel, arts and culture, fashion, shopping, dining, entertainment and real estate, in addition to celebrity interviews and cover stars. It is part of Churchill & Ives Media Brand.

The magazine is said to have a print circulation of 10,000.

The company launched a sister publication called Hamptons Smash, focusing primarily on Hamptons living, in the summer of 2011. The magazine is also published eight times annually.

In May 2012, the magazine announced that it would be expanding to additional cities, such as Boston, Los Angeles and Miami.
