= Area code 917 =

Area code in New York City

Coordinates: 40°43′42″N 73°59′39″W

The blue area is New York State (outside the City of New York); the red area is area code 917 and overlay

Area code 917 is a telephone area code in the North American Numbering Plan (NANP) for the entirety of New York City. It is an overlay code to all numbering plan areas (NPAs) in the city.

== History ==
The original area code for all of New York City's boroughs was area code 212, established when the American Telephone and Telegraph Company (AT&T) divided the North American continent into a system of numbering plan areas (NPAs) in 1947, to facilitate efficient automated long-distance telephone service with Operator Toll Dialing.

In 1984, the numbering plan area was divided by splitting Brooklyn, Queens, and Staten Island into a separate numbering plan area with area code 718, reducing 212 to only Manhattan and the Bronx.

In 1990, the New York Telephone Company wanted to assign a new area code, 917, to all cellphones and pagers in Manhattan and all telephone lines in the Bronx, to relieve number shortages in Manhattan, but the New York Public Service Commission denied the request. The restriction to mobile services was ruled impermissible by the Federal Communications Commission (FCC) which grandfathered that use in New York City.

Instead, in 1992, area code 212 was restricted for use in Manhattan only. The Bronx, along with the small exchange area of Marble Hill, was integrated into 718. All boroughs were provided with the additional area code 917, arranged in an overlay complex.

Introduced on February 4, 1992, area code 917 was the first overlay area code in the North American Numbering Plan. When it was established, all cellphones in New York City were switched to 917, freeing up telephone numbers for additional landlines.

Shortly after the establishment of the 917 code, the FCC ruled that restriction of area codes to particular types of service was prohibited, but the instance of 917 remained exempt.

== See also ==
- List of New York area codes
- List of North American Numbering Plan area codes

New York area codes: 212/332/646, 315/680, 363/516, 518/838, 585, 607, 631/934, 624/716, 347/718/929, 329/845, 914, 917
	North: 914, 845, 203/475	
West: 201/551, 862/973, 908	917 (overlays 212/332/646 and 347/718/929)	East: 516, 631
	South: 732/848	
New Jersey area codes: 201/551, 609/640, 732/848, 856, 908, 852/973
Connecticut area codes: 203/475, 860/959
