= Fildwith Ensemble Theatre =

The Fildwith Ensemble Theatre was a not-for-profit company in New York City, established in 2005, following thirteen years at its associate summer theatre company in the Adirondack Mountains Boquet River Theatre Festival.

The company's purpose is to provide a supportive "creative home" for its actors, playwrights, composers, directors and choreographers. The Fildwith encourages artists to keep their expressive spirits actively engaged between or after other professional jobs.

Its creative artists collaborate on productions of new plays and original musicals that celebrate the resilient human spirit and the elevating power of generosity, compassion and kindness in this world.

They performed a musical 'The time being' in 2007.
