= New York State Dental Foundation =

- Formation: 1980
- Type: Not for profit, 501(c)(3)
- Headquarters: Albany, New York
- Location: United States
- Chairman: Edward Downes, DDS
- Key people: Laura Leon (Executive Director)
- Staff: 4.5
- Website: nysdentalfoundation.org

The New York State Dental Foundation (NYSDF) is an American not-for-profit organization established in 1980. It is based in Albany, NY and performs dental education and outreach programs for the public.

== Overview ==
The New York State Dental Foundation is an ADA-CERP approved provider of continuing education. The foundation's executive director also serves on the steering committee for the New York State Oral Health Coalition.

== Outreach ==
The New York State Dental Foundation has also worked with the assistance of a grant from the American Dental Association to recruit dentists, willing to offer free or reduced dental assessments for children.
