= New York Bill of Rights =

New York State Legislature
- Territorial extent: New York (state)
- Enacted by: New York State Legislature
- Enacted: 1787

The New York Bill of Rights is a constitutional bill of rights first enacted in 1787 as a statute, and then as part of the state's constitution in 1881 in the U.S. state of New York. Today, the New York Bill of Rights can be found in Article I of the New York State Constitution and offers broader protections than the federal Bill of Rights.

== Background and history ==
=== English influences and Colonial New York ===
The New York Bill of Rights were influenced by its English predecessors such as Magna Carta, the Petition of Right, the Declaration of Right of 1689, and the 1689 Bill of Rights.

Prior to 1776, colonial New Yorkers attempted to pass legislation that asserted their fundamental rights. In 1683, New York's first popular assembly adopted a "Charter of Libertyes and Priviledges," and in 1691, the assembly adopted a similar Act that declared “the Rights and Priviledges of Their Majestyes Subjects Inhabiting within Their Province of New York." However, both colonial legislations were vetoed by the crown.

=== Post-1776 and the New York Constitution ===
In August 1776, shortly after the ratification of the United States Declaration of Independence on July 4, 1776, the Convention of the Representatives of the State of New York designated a committee to draft a state constitution and bill of rights. The first New York State Constitution adopted by the Convention in April 1777 did not contain a separate bill of rights. Instead, it contained several clauses guaranteeing basic rights such as: all power deriving from the people, male suffrage based on residency, the right to counsel in both criminal and civil trials, freedom of religion, abolition of religious establishments, and the guarantee of due process.

=== 1787: The Statutory Bill of Rights ===
On January 13, 1787, Samuel Jones, a member of the New York Assembly, introduced a bill entitled, "An act concerning the rights of the citizens of this State," which passed both the Assembly and Senate, and became law on January 26, 1787. This Act had thirteen paragraphs that enumerated certain rights derived from the New York State Constitution, Magna Carta, Petition of Right, 1689 Bill of Rights, and the U.S. Bill of Rights. These rights included: all power deriving from the people, due process, reasonable fines and fines with good cause, prohibition of excessive bail or fines and cruel or unusual punishment, free elections, right to petition, freedom of speech and debate, and no taxation or military service without legislative authority.

=== 1821–today: The Constitutional Bill of Rights ===
The State's Constitutional Convention of 1821 added the Bill of Rights to the state's constitution for the first time in Article VII of the 1821 Constitution. The first constitutional New York Bill of Rights had 14 clauses. In 1846, New York had another constitutional convention where it relocated the Bill of Rights to the first article of the state's constitution, and added 2 new clauses: prohibiting cruel and unusual punishment and recognizing citizens' rights to assemble and petition the legislature. The 1894 Constitution would add other clauses pertaining to eminent domain, lotteries, and wrongful death actions. Several revisions happened to the New York Bill of Rights in the 20th Century that produced today's Bill of Rights.

== The current Bill of Rights ==
Today, the New York Bill of Rights is found in Article I of the New York Constitution and has 19 clauses. The New York Bill of Rights includes: the right to a jury trial, freedom of religion, prohibition of excessive fines and cruel punishment, protections against eminent domain, freedom of speech and press, right to assemble and petition, guarantee of equal protection under the law and prohibition against discrimination, and protections against unjust searches and seizures. Notably, the New York Bill of Rights guarantees environmental rights, which provides that "[e]ach person shall have a right to clean air and water, and a healthful environment." This right was added to the state's Bill of Rights by the vote of the people of New York on November 2, 2021. On November 5, 2024, the New York electorate approved an equal rights amendment expressly inclusive of LGBT and disabled individuals, along with reproductive autonomy and pregnancy outcomes.

== See also ==
- United States Bill of Rights
