= Eimatai Leadership Development Project =

The Eimatai Leadership Development Project is a program of the Yeshiva University Center for the Jewish Future.

Founded in 1999, its mission is to expose Jewish high school students to issues facing the Jewish and Global communities, train them in leadership skills, and provide the framework for them to take action in the real world.

Successful programs that have come out of Eimatai include Project Rayut and Students Against Terrorism.
