= List of New York area codes =

New York area codes (blue area).

The North American Numbering Plan administration has divided the state of New York into twelve distinct geographic numbering plan areas (NPAs) with a total of twenty-three area codes.

| Area code | Year | Parent NPA | Overlay | Numbering plan area |
|---|---|---|---|---|
| 212 | 1947 | – | 212/332/646/917 | New York City: Manhattan |
| 646 | 1999 | 212 | 212/332/646/917 | New York City: Manhattan |
| 332 | 2017 | 212/646 | 212/332/646/917 | New York City: Manhattan |
| 718 | 1984 | 212 | 347/718/917/929/465 | all of New York City outside of Manhattan |
| 347 | 1999 | 718 | 347/718/917/929/465 | all of New York City outside of Manhattan |
| 929 | 2011 | 347/718 | 347/718/917/929/465 | all of New York City outside of Manhattan |
| 465 | 2026 | 347/718/929 | 347/718/917/929/465 | all of New York City outside of Manhattan |
| 917 | 1992 | 212 | 212/332/646/917 | New York City |
| 917 | 1992 | 718 | 347/718/917/929 | New York City |
| 315 | 1947 | – | 315/680 | North-central New York (Syracuse, Utica, Watertown) |
| 680 | 2017 | 315 | 315/680 | North-central New York (Syracuse, Utica, Watertown) |
| 518 | 1947 | – | 518/838 | North-eastern New York (Albany, Glens Falls, Plattsburgh, Saratoga Springs) |
| 838 | 2017 | 518 | 518/838 | North-eastern New York (Albany, Glens Falls, Plattsburgh, Saratoga Springs) |
| 716 | 1947 | – | 624/716 | Far-western New York (Buffalo, Dunkirk-Fredonia, Olean, Jamestown, Niagara Falls, Tonawanda) |
| 624 | 2023 | 716 | 624/716 | Far-western New York (Buffalo, Dunkirk-Fredonia, Olean, Jamestown, Niagara Falls, Tonawanda) |
| 585 | 2001 | 716 | – | Mid-western New York (Rochester, Batavia, Wellsville) |
| 607 | 1954 | 315 | – | South-central New York (Binghamton, Elmira, Ithaca, Bath, Norwich) |
| 607 | 1954 | 716 | – | South-central New York (Binghamton, Elmira, Ithaca, Bath, Norwich) |
| 914 | 1947 | – | – | Southeastern New York (Westchester County) |
| 516 | 1951 | 914 | 363/516 | Long Island (Nassau County) |
| 363 | 2023 | 516 | 363/516 | Long Island (Nassau County) |
| 845 | 2000 | 914 | 329/845 | Southeastern New York (Poughkeepsie, Middletown, Newburgh, West Point, Goshen) |
| 329 | 2023 | 845 | 329/845 | Southeastern New York (Poughkeepsie, Middletown, Newburgh, West Point, Goshen) |
| 631 | 1999 | 516 | 631/934 | Long Island (Suffolk County) |
| 934 | 2016 | 631 | 631/934 | Long Island (Suffolk County) |

== New York City ==
| | 212 | 332 | 347 | 465 | 646 | 718 | 917 | 929 |
|---|---|---|---|---|---|---|---|---|
| Bronx | | | O | O | | O | A | O |
| Brooklyn | | | O | O | | O | A | O |
| Manhattan | M | M | | | M | | A | |
| Queens | | | O | O | | O | A | O |
| Staten Island | | | O | O | | O | A | O |

| Key: | Manhattan only | Outer boroughs | All boroughs |
