= New York State Office for the Prevention of Domestic Violence =

New York state government agency

The New York State Office for the Prevention of Domestic Violence is a New York state government agency within the Executive Department created in 1992 tasked to help New York state residents deal with domestic violence in their lives and those of their friends, family, neighbors, and acquaintances in the state. Its current executive director is Kelli Owens.

The office played an important role in the passage of the state's strangulation law in 2010 which classifies the intent to kill with that method of harm as a felony: If an offender releases their grip within a certain period of time, there is usually no evidence what transpired. Then-executive director Amy Barash expressed in 2013, when asked about progress up to then: "The number of homicides has gone down over the past twenty-five years.... A lot of the legal progress is due to the federal Violence Against Women Act.

== Executive directors ==
- Kelli Owens, 2019–present
- Gwen Wright, 2012–2019
- Amy Barasch, 2007–12
