= New York City Science and Engineering Fair =

Projects on display at NYCSEF 2019

Preliminary round, at the City College of New York

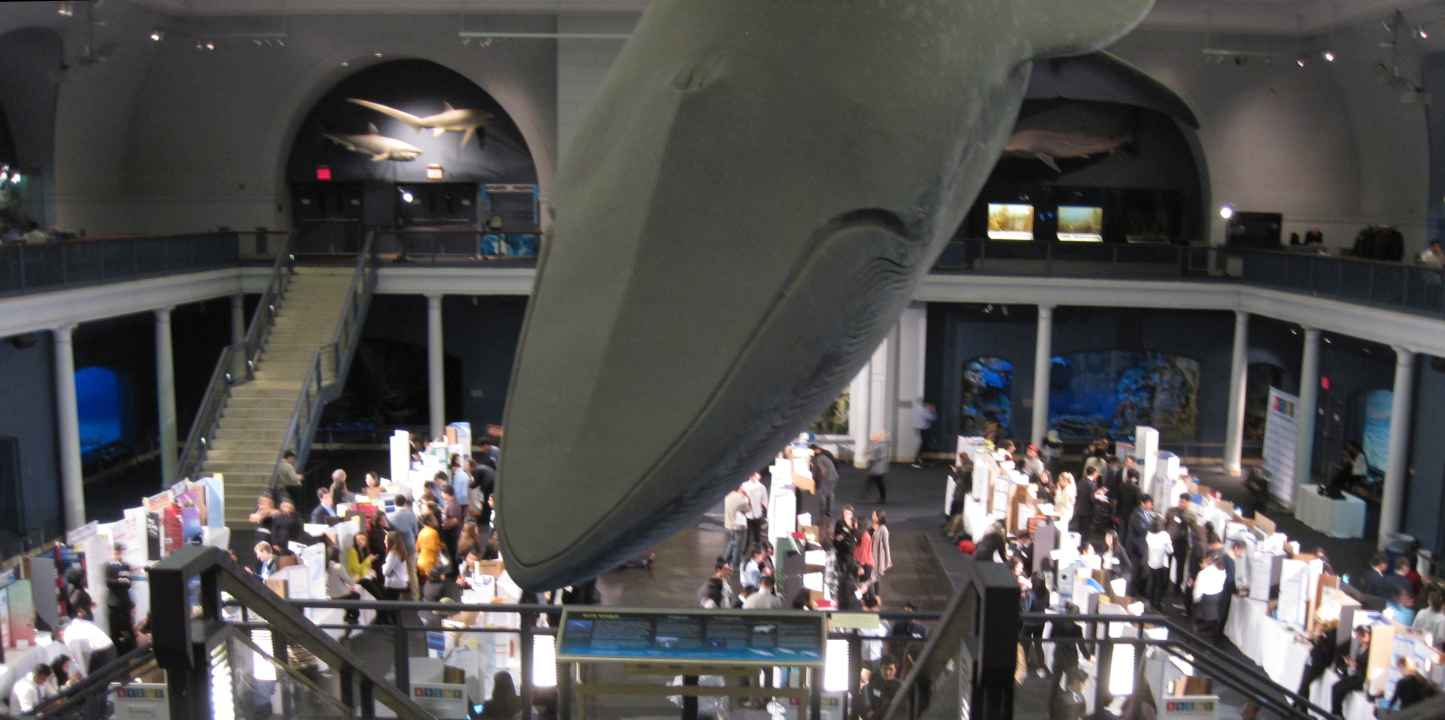
Finals round, at the American Museum of Natural History

The New York City Science and Engineering Fair (NYCSEF) is an annual science fair contested by around 700 high school students from Queens, Manhattan, Bronx, Brooklyn and Staten Island, making it the largest high school research competition in New York City. About 150 participants advance to the finals round. Awards include scholarships to study at CUNY's City College of New York and Hunter College, while the finalists win a trip to represent New York City at the International Science and Engineering Fair. Winners represent Team NYC at ISEF and compete for $4,000,000 in awards. The event is sponsored by the New York City Department of Education (NYCDOE) and the City University of New York (CUNY) Office of Academic Affairs. Other science fairs include the Google Science Fair, Siemens Competition in Math, Science & Technology, Regeneron Science Talent Search and Junior Science and Humanities Symposium.

== Obama's visit to NYCSEF ==
In 2011, President Barack Obama and Mayor Michael R. Bloomberg visited the New York City Science and Engineering Fair at the American Museum of Natural History. President Obama was the keynote speaker for the event addressing the 191 students participating at the Finals Round. President Obama said, “I want you to know that you are the key to our success. You’re going to be able to find a job because there’s going to be a great advantage for the skills you’re learning. So you should all be extraordinarily proud of the work you’re doing.”

== Judges ==
All of the judges are volunteers who judge the categories in the biological, physical sciences, plant sciences, behavioral and social sciences, mathematics, engineering, etc.
