= New York Policy Forum =

- Formation: 2011
- Type: Public policy
- Location: New York, NY
- Website: www.newyorkpolicyforum.com

The New York Policy Forum was a not-for-profit organization based in New York City. Founded by Jonathan Cohen and John Giardino the New York Policy Forum hosts a series of "expert panels and speakers on a wide range of issues spanning public policy, human rights, education, and the arts."

== Panels Hosted by the New York Policy Forum ==
=== The Future of New York’s Upstate Cities: Buffalo, Rochester and Syracuse - June 9, 2011 ===
==== Panelists ====
- Bruce Fisher, founding Director of the Center for Economic and Policy Studies at Buffalo State College and a former Deputy County Executive of Erie County.
- E.J. McMahon, Senior Fellow at the Empire Center and the Manhattan Institute's Senior Fellow for Tax and Budgetary Studies.
- The Honorable Stephanie Miner, Mayor of Syracuse, New York
- Moderator: Mitchell Moss, Director of the Rudin Center for Transportation Policy and Management and Henry Rice Professor of Urban Policy and Planning at New York University's Wagner Graduate School of Public Service.

=== Hydrofracking in New York’s Marcellus Shale: Poison or Panacea? - October 6, 2011 ===
==== Panelists ====
- Dr. Terry Engelder, Professor of Geosciences, Penn State University and one of Foreign Policy Magazine's Top 100 Global Thinkers for 2011.
- Albert F. Appleton, former Commissioner, New York City Department of Environmental Protection and partner with Citizens for Water
- Stuart Gruskin, former Deputy Commissioner, New York State Department of Environmental Conservation
- Matthew T. Ryan, Mayor of the City of Binghamton, New York
- Moderator: Jamie Kitman, Automobile Magazine

=== Jazz and Democracy in America - December 8, 2011 ===
==== Panelists ====
- T.S. Monk, Legendary Jazz Artist
- Helen Sung, Award-Winning Jazz Pianist
- Sheila Anderson, Jazz Host, WBGO
- Dr. Wesley Watkins IV, Director, The Jazz & Democracy Project
- Moderator: John Giardino, New York Policy Forum
