= Area codes 716 and 624 =

Telephone area code for Western New York state

Coordinates: 42°40′41″N 78°33′7″W

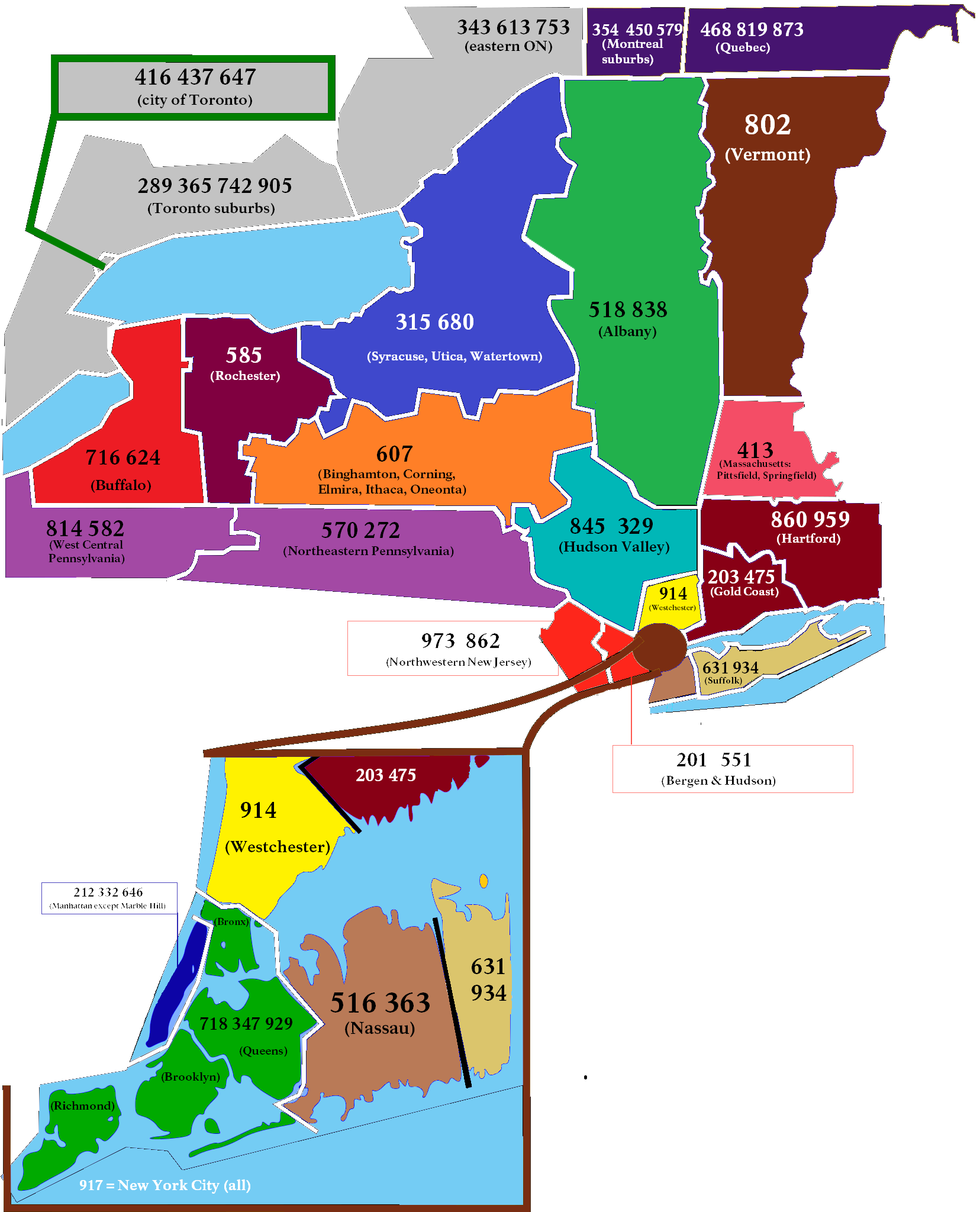
Area codes in New York state with the area codes 716 and 624 highlighted in red (above Area codes 814 and 582)

Area codes 716 and 624 are telephone area codes in the North American Numbering Plan (NANP) for Buffalo, Niagara Falls, and four surrounding counties in western New York. 716 was one of the original North American area codes established in 1947, while 624 was assigned to the identical numbering plan area (NPA) in 2023.

== History ==
When the American Telephone and Telegraph Company (AT&T) devised the first nationwide telephone numbering plan for Operator Toll Dialing in the 1940s, New York state was initially divided into five numbering plan areas, the most of any state, assigning a distinct area code to each. In 1947, area code 716 was assigned to an area containing a significant portion of Central New York, as far east as Corning.

In 1954, the numbering plan area was reduced in size by merging its eastern portion with the southern portion of NPA 315, to create area code 607.

In 2001, the new area code 585 was created to serve the city of Rochester and its suburbs. Until 1993, it was bounded at the Niagara River by area code 416 (now 905) in Ontario.

Prior to October 2021, area code 716 had telephone numbers assigned for the central office code 988. In 2020, 988 had been designated nationwide as a dialing code for the National Suicide Prevention Lifeline, which created a conflict for exchanges that permit seven-digit dialing. This area code was therefore scheduled to transition to ten-digit dialing by October 24, 2021.

A 2022 analysis by the NANP Administrator determined that the area code 716 was projected to exhaust its central office prefixes in 2024. As a result, the New York Public Service Commission approved area code 624, and was assigned to form an all-service overlay complex in the 716 area, with an in-service date of November 16, 2023.

== Service area ==
The numbering plan area comprises the following counties:

- Erie County (includes city of Buffalo and surrounding suburbs)
- Cattaraugus County (includes city of Olean)
- Chautauqua County (includes cities of Jamestown and Dunkirk)
- Niagara County (includes Niagara Falls and Lockport)

Because of Olean's proximity to the 716/585 line, some Olean exchanges use area code 585, particularly those in use for Sprint Corporation cell phones.

== See also ==
- List of New York area codes
- List of North American Numbering Plan area codes

New York area codes: 212/332/646, 315/680, 363/516, 518/838, 585, 607, 631/934, 624/716, 347/718/929, 329/845, 914, 917
	North: 289/365/905, Lake Ontario	
West: 289/365/905, Lake Erie	716/624	East: 585
	South: 814/582	
Ontario area codes: 416/437/647/942, 519/226/548/382, 613/343/753, 705/249/683, 807, 905/289/365/742
Pennsylvania area codes: 215/267/445, 412, 570/272, 610/484/835, 717/223, 724, 814/582, 878
