= Area codes 212, 646, and 332 =

Area codes in Manhattan, New York

Coordinates: 40°43′42″N 73°59′39″W

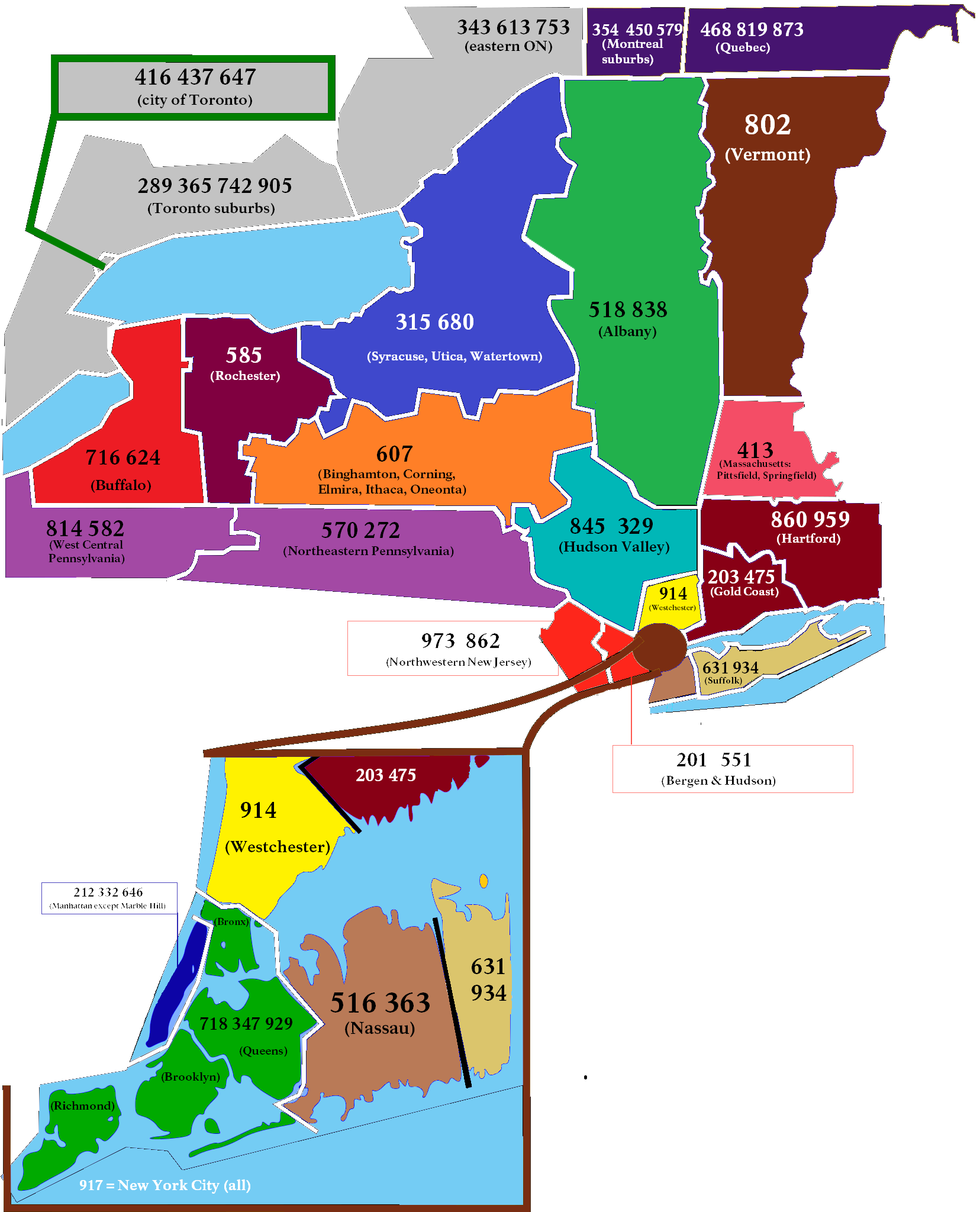
Area codes in New York state; area codes 212, 646 and 332 highlighted in dark blue

Area codes 212, 646, and 332 are area codes in the North American Numbering Plan (NANP) for most of the borough of Manhattan in New York City. By area, it is one of the smallest numbering plan areas (NPAs) in the US. The area codes form an overlay complex, and are also overlaid by area code 917 of a numbering plan area that comprises the entirety of New York City.

Area code 212 is the original code assigned for all of the city in 1947. Its use was restricted to just Manhattan and the Bronx in 1985, when area code 718 was created for the city's other three boroughs. The Bronx joined area code 718 in 1992, leaving area code 212 solely for Manhattan. Subsequently, area code 646 was assigned as an overlay code for Manhattan in 1999, and area code 332 was added in 2017.

== History ==
Area code 212 is one of the original North American area codes assigned by the American Telephone and Telegraph Company (AT&T) in 1947, originally serving all five boroughs of New York City. For the next 37 years, New York City was one of the largest toll-free calling zones in North America.

On February 1, 1984, in response to a request from New York Telephone, the New York Public Service Commission voted to create a second area code for New York City. The split was implemented in a way that divided the city's three million telephone numbers roughly in half. Brooklyn, Queens, and Staten Island received the new area code 718, while Manhattan and the Bronx kept 212. Amid protests from local officials and state lawmakers, the commission was persuaded by New York Telephone's reasoning that a new area code was needed to "prevent an impending exhaustion of telephone numbers."

New York Telephone made some 718 telephone numbers operational several days in advance. Despite state lawmakers for the outer boroughs threatening legislation to stop the division, 718 began its split as scheduled on September 1, 1984. Permissive dialing of 212 continued across New York City, during which either 212 or 718 could be used, until January 1, 1985, when the use of 718 became mandatory for the boroughs affected.

On July 1, 1992, the 718 territory was expanded to include the Bronx and the Marble Hill neighborhood of Manhattan, while the rest of Manhattan remained in 212. Permissive dialing of 212 continued across the Bronx until May 16, 1993, during which either 212 or 718 could be used; after that date, 718 had to be used for telephone calls to the Bronx from everywhere outside the borough except the three boroughs that originally had the 718 code, and Bronx residents telephoning Manhattan had to dial 212. On September 25, 1993, callers from the Bronx no longer had to dial 718 to reach Brooklyn, Queens and Staten Island.

In 1992, the entire city was overlaid with area code 917, which had originally been planned for only the Bronx and mobile service.

With available 917 mobile numbers becoming scarce, area code 646 was implemented on July 1, 1999, as an overlay for Manhattan.

During November 2015, area code 332 was assigned as a third overlay area code for Manhattan, the fourth serving the area and the seventh serving New York City. Area code 332 became active on June 10, 2017, as area code 212 was expected to become depleted of numbers during the third quarter of 2017, and 646 is expected to become depleted of numbers by 2030.

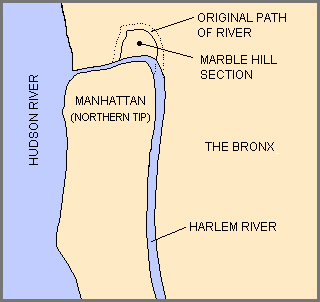
Marble Hill, a neighborhood of the borough of Manhattan, is located on the mainland, contiguous with the Bronx.

The Manhattan neighborhood of Marble Hill is located in the 718/347/929 numbering plan area (NPA), rather than the Manhattan NPA.

Marble Hill, although administratively a part of the Borough of Manhattan, was severed from Manhattan Island by the construction of the Harlem River Ship Canal during 1895. The by-passed segment of the Harlem River was filled in 1914, making the community a geographic part of the Bronx.

When the Bronx was reassigned with area code 718 in 1992, Marble Hill residents fought unsuccessfully to retain 212. Marble Hill's trunks are wired into the Bronx wire center, and it would have been too expensive for New York Telephone to rewire them.

== Market reputation ==
A business with a 212 area code is often perceived as having the prestige of Manhattan and the convenience of stability, particularly if a number has been in service for several decades. An example is 212-736-5000 (PEnnsylvania 6-5000), the number for the Hotel Pennsylvania in Midtown. Prior to its closure in 2020 and subsequent demolition, the hotel claimed it was the oldest telephone number used continuously in New York City, though this is disputed. The owners of the hotel have stated the phone number will remain in use for the new office tower replacing the historic hotel. The hotel's phone number appears as the title of the 1940 Glenn Miller Orchestra hit song "Pennsylvania 6-5000".

Area code 212 is considered prestigious by some Manhattan residents, because of its tradition as the city's original sole area code, and today's scarcity of available telephone numbers. Businesses sell 212-telephone numbers, although it is uncertain whether the customer or the telephone company is the legal owner of a number. In August 2010, AT&T reported that there were no new numbers available for area code 212. Several years before, new landlines in Manhattan were assigned in the newer area codes, and users ported 212 numbers obtained from online sales.

== See also ==
- 212 (song)
- List of New York area codes
- List of North American Numbering Plan area codes

New York area codes: 212/332/646, 315/680, 363/516, 518/838, 585, 607, 631/934, 624/716, 347/718/929, 329/845, 914, 917
	North: 347/718/929/917	
West: 201/551	212/332/646, 917	East: 347/718/929/917
	South: 347/718/929/917	
New Jersey area codes: 201/551, 609/640, 732/848, 856, 908, 852/973
