= Area codes 516 and 363 =

Area code in Nassau County, New York

Coordinates: 40.74°N 73.63°W

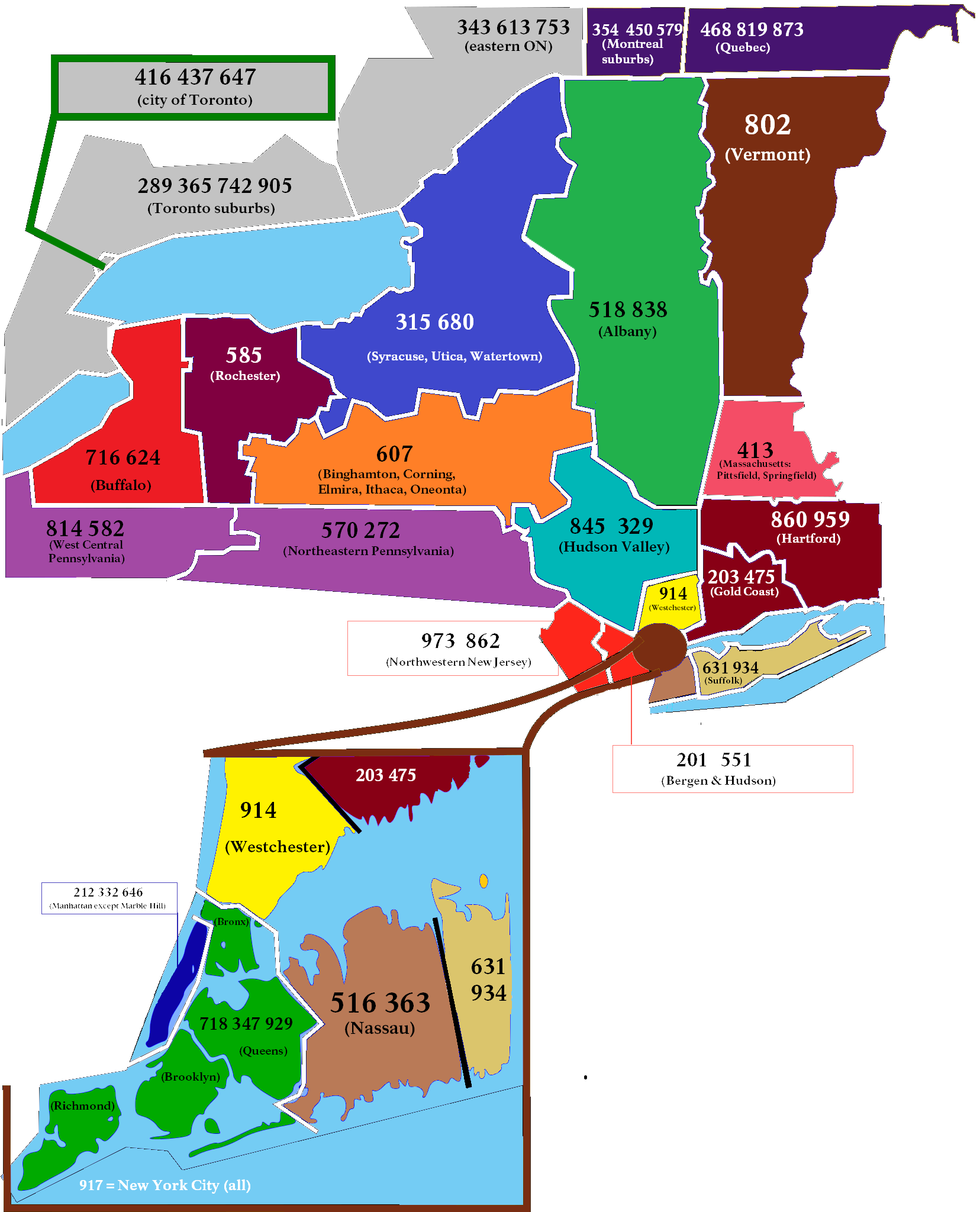
Area codes in New York state: area codes 516 and 363 are highlighted in light brown.

Area codes 516 and 363 are telephone overlay area codes in the North American Numbering Plan (NANP) for the U.S. state of New York. The numbering plan area (NPA) comprises Nassau County on Long Island. Area code 516 was created in 1951 and 363 was added to the numbering plan area in 2023.

== History ==
When the American Telephone and Telegraph Company (AT&T) established the first nationwide telephone numbering plan for Operator Toll Dialing in October 1947, Nassau and Suffolk counties, the lower Hudson Valley, and some areas adjacent were assigned area code 914. At the time, this area was largely coextensive with the New York state portion of the New York metropolitan area. In 1951, Nassau and Suffolk were designated as a separate numbering plan area (NPA) with area code 516.

Despite Long Island's growth in both population and telephone service during the second half of the 20th century, this configuration remained for five decades. By the late 1990s, the proliferation of pagers and cell phones required further division to provide more telephone numbers for Long Island. On November 1, 1999, Suffolk was separated as a new numbering plan area with area code 631, while Nassau retained 516. Permissive dialing of 516 across Long Island continued until spring 2000.

Prior to October 2021, area code 516 had telephone numbers assigned for the central office code 988. In 2020, 988 was designated nationwide as a dialing code for the National Suicide Prevention Lifeline, which created a conflict for exchanges that permit seven-digit dialing. This area code was therefore scheduled to transition to ten-digit dialing by October 24, 2021.

A 2021 NANP analysis of numbering resources projects exhaustion of NPA 516 during the second quarter of 2023. As a result, additional relief was expected. An overlay of 516 with a new area code was recommended, although a boundary-extension overlay was also considered which would have expanded area code 934 (overlaying 631) to also overlay 516. In January 2022, the new area code 363 was announced to overlay 516 on January 20, 2023.

== See also ==
- List of New York area codes
- List of North American Numbering Plan area codes

New York area codes: 212/332/646, 315/680, 363/516, 518/838, 585, 607, 631/934, 624/716, 347/718/929, 329/845, 914, 917
	North: 914, 203/475	
West: 347/718/929, 917	516/363	East: 631/934
	South: Atlantic Ocean	
