= German Reform Movement (New York City, 1800s) =

The German Reform Movement was a political movement active in New York City during the late 19th century.
