= List of sister cities in New York =

This is a list of sister cities in the United States state of New York. Sister cities, known in Europe as twin towns, are cities which partner with each other to promote human contact and cultural links, although this partnering is not limited to cities and often includes counties, regions, states and other sub-national entities.

Many New York jurisdictions work with foreign cities through Sister Cities International, an organization whose goal is to "promote peace through mutual respect, understanding, and cooperation."

== A ==
Albany

- Bucha, Ukraine
- Nijmegen, Netherlands
- Verona, Italy

Amityville

- Le Bourget, France

== B ==
Binghamton

- Borovichi, Russia
- El Charcón (La Libertad), El Salvador
- La Teste-de-Buch, France

Buffalo

- Aboadze, Ghana
- Cape Coast, Ghana
- Changzhou, China
- Dortmund, Germany
- Drohobych, Ukraine
- Horlivka, Ukraine
- Kanazawa, Japan
- Kiryat Gat, Israel
- Rzeszów, Poland
- Saint Ann, Jamaica
- Siena, Italy
- Torremaggiore, Italy
- Yıldırım, Turkey

== C ==
Cheektowaga

- Łowicz, Poland

Columbia County

- Larreynaga, Nicaragua

Corning

- Kakegawa, Japan
- Lviv, Ukraine
- San Giovanni Valdarno, Italy

Coventry

- Coventry, England, United Kingdom

== G ==
Glen Cove

- Sturno, Italy

Glens Falls

- Saga, Japan

Great Neck

- Dakhla, Western Sahara
- Kiryat Ono, Israel

Great Neck Plaza

- Tiberias, Israel

Greece

- Vitré, France

Greenport

- Mangalia, Romania

== H ==
Hempstead

- (Israel) Shomron, West Bank

Honeoye Falls

- Borgne, Haiti

Horseheads

- Nakagawa, Japan

== I ==
Irondequoit

- Poltava, Ukraine

Ithaca

- Eldoret, Kenya
- Pokhara, Nepal

== J ==
Jamestown

- Jakobstad, Finland

== K ==
Kinderhook

- Buren, Netherlands

== L ==
Little Falls

- Myjava, Slovakia

== N ==
Nassau County

- Mateh Binyamin, West Bank
- Pushkin, Russia
- Taichung, Taiwan

New Paltz

- Niimi, Japan

New Rochelle

- La Rochelle, France

New York City

- Athens, Greece
- Beijing, China
- Bridgetown, Barbados
- Budapest, Hungary
- Ho Chi Minh City, Vietnam
- Jerusalem, Israel
- Johannesburg, South Africa
- London, England, United Kingdom
- Madrid, Spain
- Santo Domingo, Dominican Republic
- Seoul, South Korea
- Tokyo, Japan

New York City – Brooklyn

- Anzio, Italy
- Beşiktaş, Turkey
- Bnei Brak, Israel
- Chaoyang (Beijing), China
- Gdynia, Poland
- Konak, Turkey
- Lambeth, England, United Kingdom
- Leopoldstadt (Vienna), Austria
- Üsküdar, Turkey
- Yiwu, China

New York City – Manhattan

- Seocho (Seoul), South Korea

New York City – Staten Island

- Ulcinj, Montenegro

== O ==
Oneonta

- Krasnoyarsk, Russia

Orange County

- Kaohsiung, Taiwan

== P ==
Peekskill

- (Republic of Ireland) Castlebar, Ireland
- Cuenca, Ecuador

Port Jervis

- Lapio, Italy

== R ==
Ramapo

- Beit Shemesh, Israel

Red Hook

- Mas-ha, Palestine

Rhinebeck

- Larreynaga, Nicaragua

Rochester

- Alytus, Lithuania
- Bamako, Mali
- Caltanissetta, Italy
- Hamamatsu, Japan
- Kraków, Poland
- Puerto Plata, Dominican Republic
- Rehovot, Israel
- Rennes, France
- Veliky Novgorod, Russia
- (Republic of Ireland) Waterford, Ireland
- Würzburg, Germany
- Xianyang, China

== S ==
Saranac Lake

- Entrains-sur-Nohain, France
- Sainte-Agathe-des-Monts, Canada

Saratoga Springs

- Chekhov, Russia

Schenectady

- Kunming, China
- Nijkerk, Netherlands

Syracuse

- Boise, United States
- Chiayi, Taiwan
- Fuzhou, China
- Irpin, Ukraine
- Tampere, Finland

== W ==
Warren County

- Saga, Japan

White Plains

- Chernihiv, Ukraine

Woodstock

- Nimbin (Lismore), Australia
