= History of New York (state) =

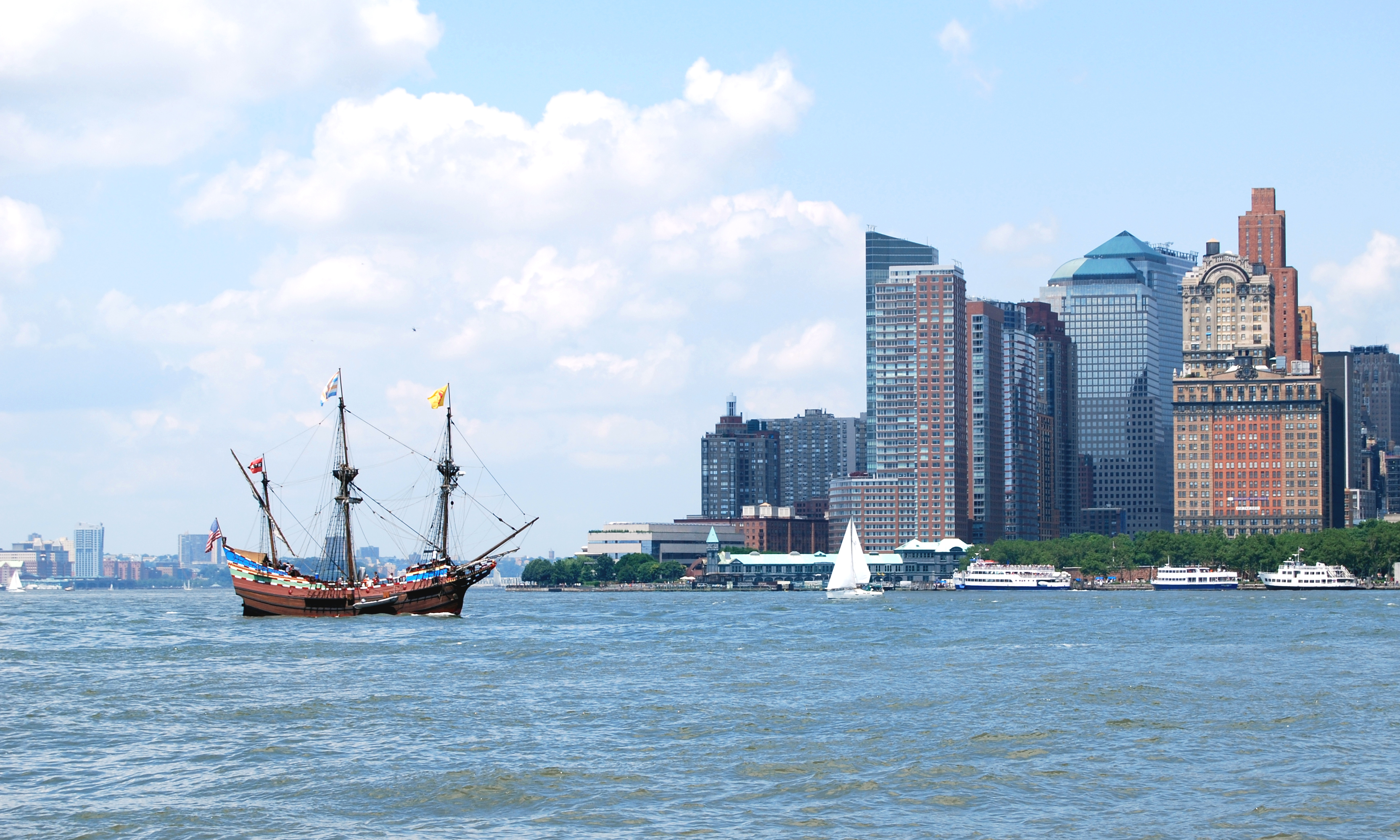
A historical juxtaposition: a replica of Henry Hudson's 17th-century Halve Maen passes modern-day lower Manhattan where the original ship would have sailed while investigating New York Harbor.

The history of New York begins around 10,000 B.C. when the first people arrived. By 1100 A.D. two main cultures had become dominant as the Iroquoian and Algonquian developed. European discovery of New York was led by Giovanni da Verrazzano in 1524 followed by the first land claim in 1609 by the Dutch. As part of New Netherland, the colony was important in the fur trade and eventually became an agricultural resource thanks to the patroon system. In 1626, the Dutch thought they had bought the island of Manhattan from Native Americans. In 1664, England renamed the colony New York, after the Duke of York and Albany, brother of King Charles II. New York City gained prominence in the 18th century as a major trading port in the Thirteen Colonies.

New York played a pivotal role during the American Revolution and subsequent war. The Stamp Act Congress in 1765 brought together representatives from across the Thirteen Colonies to form a unified response to British policies. The Sons of Liberty were active in New York City to challenge British authority. After a major loss at the Battle of Long Island, the Continental Army suffered a series of additional defeats that forced a retreat from the New York City area, leaving the strategic port and harbor to the British army and navy as their North American base of operations for the rest of the war. The Battle of Saratoga was the turning point of the war in favor of the Americans, convincing France to formally ally with them. New York's constitution was adopted in 1777, and strongly influenced the United States Constitution. New York City was the national capital at various times between 1788 and 1790, where the Bill of Rights was drafted. Albany became the permanent state capital in 1797. In 1787, New York became the eleventh state to ratify the United States Constitution.

New York hosted significant transportation advancements in the 19th century, including the first steamboat line in 1807, the Erie Canal in 1825, and America's first regularly scheduled rail service in 1831. These advancements led to the expanded settlement of western New York and trade ties to the Midwest settlements around the Great Lakes.

Due to New York City's trade ties to the South, there were numerous southern sympathizers in the early days of the American Civil War and the mayor proposed secession. Far from any of the battles, New York ultimately sent the most soldiers and money to support the Union cause. Thereafter, the state helped create the industrial age and consequently was home to some of the first labor unions.

During the 19th century, New York City became the main entry point for European immigrants to the United States, beginning with a wave of Irish during their Great Famine. Millions came through Castle Clinton in Battery Park before Ellis Island opened in 1892 to welcome millions more, increasingly from eastern and southern Europe. The Statue of Liberty opened in 1886 and became a symbol of hope. New York boomed during the Roaring Twenties, before the Wall Street Crash of 1929, and skyscrapers expressed the energy of the city. New York City was the site of successive tallest buildings in the world from 1913 to 1974.

The buildup of defense industries for World War II turned around the state's economy from the Great Depression, as hundreds of thousands worked to defeat the Axis powers. Following the war, the state experienced significant suburbanization around all the major cities, and most central cities shrank. The Thruway system opened in 1956, signaling another era of transportation advances.

Following a period of near-bankruptcy in the late 1970s, New York City renewed its stature as a cultural center, attracted more immigration, and hosted the development of new music styles. The city developed from publishing to become a media capital over the second half of the 20th century, hosting most national news channels and broadcasts. Some of its newspapers became nationally and globally renowned. The state's manufacturing base eroded with the restructuring of industry, and the state transitioned into service industries.

== Indigenous history ==
The first peoples of New York are estimated to have arrived around 10,000 BC.

Archaeologists divide these early periods into the Paleoindian (13,000-10,000 BC), Early Archaic (8,000-6,000 BC), Middle Archaic (6,000 BC to 4,000 BC) and Late Archaic (4,000-1,500 BC) Periods. With the receding of the Laurentide glacier, land opened up for early human hunter gatherers. The oldest evidence of humans comes from spear points at the West Athens Hill site in Greene County and has been dated to around 10,500 BC.

In the Late Archaic, larger sites emerged as the warming environment was able to host larger populations of game for hunters around 4,000 BC. The Lamoka and Brewerton phases emerged in central and northern New York around 2,500 BC.

While groups were managing plants and collecting nuts for thousands of years, the first evidence of agriculture in New York can be dated to around 800 AD with the domestication of maize.

Around AD 800, the ancestors of the Haudenosaunee moved into the area from the Appalachian region. The people of the Point Peninsula complex were the predecessors of the Algonquian peoples of New York. By around 1100, the distinct Iroquoian-speaking and Algonquian-speaking cultures that would eventually be encountered by Europeans had developed. The five nations of the Haudenosaunee League developed a powerful confederacy about the 15th century that controlled territory throughout present-day New York, into Pennsylvania around the Great Lakes. For centuries, the Mohawk cultivated maize fields in the lowlands of the Mohawk River, which were later taken over by Dutch settlers at Schenectady, New York when they bought this territory. The Haudenosaunee nations to the west also had well-cultivated areas and orchards.

New York was dominated by Iroquoian (green) and Algonquian (red) Indian tribes.

The Haudenosaunee established dominance over the fur trade throughout their territory, bargaining with European colonists. Other New York tribes were more subject to either European destruction or assimilation within the Haudenosaunee Confederacy. Situated at major Native trade routes in the Northeast and positioned between French and English zones of settlement, the Haudenosaunee were intensely caught up with the onrush of Europeans, which is also to say that the settlers, whether Dutch, French or English, were caught up with the Haudenosaunee as well. Algonquian tribes were less united among their tribes; they typically lived along rivers, streams, or the Atlantic Coast. But, both groups of natives were well-established peoples with highly sophisticated cultural systems; these were little understood or appreciated by the European colonists who encountered them. The natives had "a complex and elaborate native economy that included hunting, gathering, manufacturing, and farming...[and were] a mosaic of Native American tribes, nations, languages, and political associations." The Haudenosaunee usually met at an Onondaga in Northern New York, which changed every century or so, where they would coordinate policies on how to deal with Europeans and strengthen the bond between the Five Nations.

Indigenous groups who have called New York home include the Haudenosaunee (including the Mohawk, Oneida, Onondaga, Cayuga, Seneca, and Tuscarora), Mohican, Susquehannock, Petun, Chonnonton, Wenrohronon, Eriehronon and Nanticoke.

== Early European exploration ==
In 1524, Giovanni da Verrazzano, an Italian explorer in the service of the French crown, explored the Atlantic coast of North America between the Carolinas and Newfoundland, including New York Harbor and Narragansett Bay. On April 17, 1524, Verrazzano entered New York Bay, by way of the Strait now called the Narrows. He described "a vast coastline with a deep delta in which every kind of ship could pass" and he adds: "that it extends inland for a league and opens up to form a beautiful lake. This vast sheet of water swarmed with native boats". He landed on the tip of Manhattan and perhaps on the furthest point of Long Island.

In 1535, Jacques Cartier, a French explorer, became the first European to describe and map the Saint Lawrence River from the Atlantic Ocean, sailing as far upriver as the site of Montreal.

== Dutch and British colonial period ==
On April 4, 1609, Henry Hudson, in the employ of the Dutch East India Company, departed Amsterdam in command of the ship Halve Maen (Half Moon). On September 3 he reached the estuary of the Hudson River. He sailed up the Hudson River to about Albany near the confluence of the Mohawk River and the Hudson. His voyage was used to establish Dutch claims to the region and to the fur trade that prospered there after a trading post was established at Albany in 1614.

In 1614, the Dutch under the command of Hendrick Christiaensen, built Fort Nassau (now Albany) the first Dutch settlement in North America and the first European settlement in what would become New York. It was replaced by nearby Fort Orange in 1624. In 1625, Fort Amsterdam was built on the southern tip of Manhattan Island to defend the Hudson River. This settlement grew to become the city New Amsterdam. The Dutch West India Company brought eleven enslaved Africans to the settlement in 1627, introducing institutionalized slavery to New York.

The British conquered New Netherland in 1664; (Note: The takeover is commonly said to have been part of the Second Anglo-Dutch War. But, this war was not officially declared until 1665; the Dutch and British were at peace when the attack was made.) Lenient terms of surrender most likely kept local resistance to a minimum. The colony and New Amsterdam were both renamed New York (and "Beverwijck" was renamed Albany) after its new proprietor, James II later King of England, Ireland and Scotland, who was at the time Duke of York and Duke of Albany (Note: James Stuart (1633–1701), brother and successor of Charles II, was both the Duke of York and Duke of Albany before being crowned James II of England and James VII of Scotland in 1685.). The population of New Netherland at the time of English takeover was 7,000–8,000.

== Province of New York (1664–1776) ==
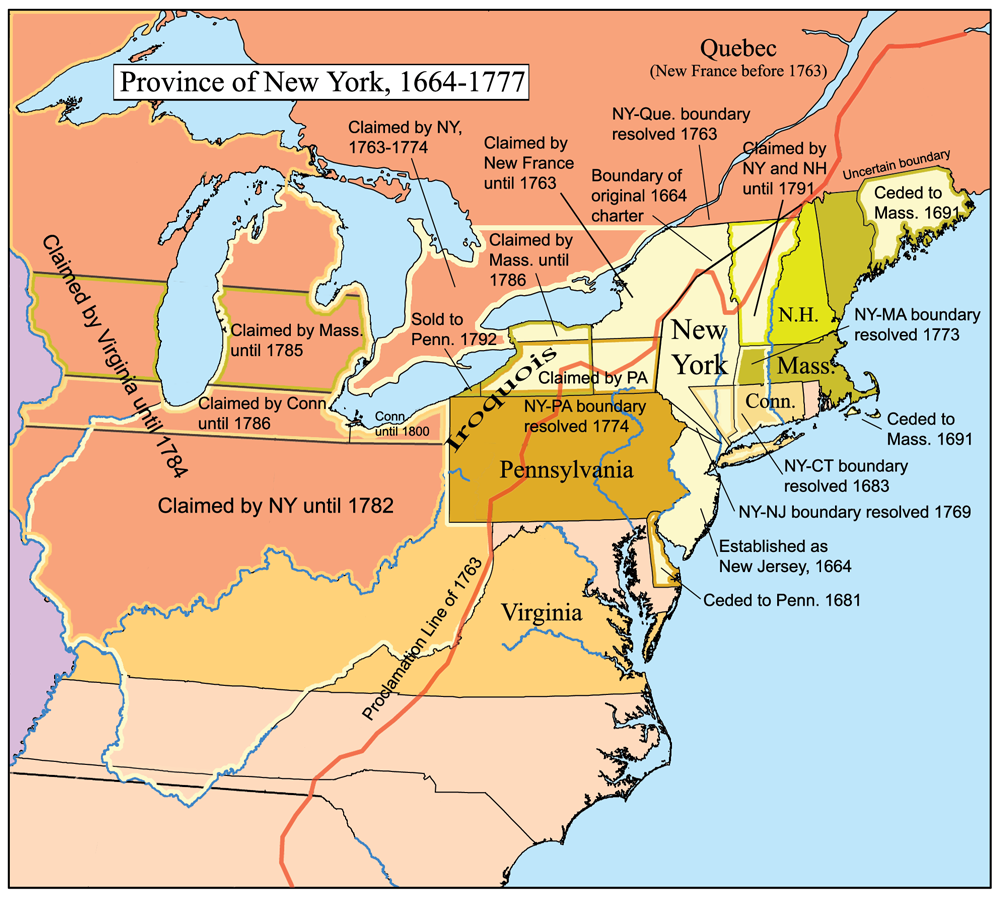
Map of the Province of New York.

Thousands of poor German farmers, chiefly from the Palatine region of Germany, migrated to upstate districts after 1700. They kept to themselves, married their own, spoke German, attended Lutheran churches, and retained their own customs and foods. They emphasized farm ownership. Some mastered English to become conversant with local legal and business opportunities. They ignored the Indians and tolerated slavery (although few were rich enough to own a slave).

Large manors were developed along the Hudson River by elite colonists during the 18th century, including Livingston, Cortlandt, Philipsburg, and Rensselaerswyck. (Note: "Rensselaerswyck" is the Anglicized form of the Dutch Rensselaerswijck. The patroonship was confirmed as an English manor by Charles II in 1664.) The manors represented more than half of the colony's undeveloped land. The Province of New York thrived during this time, its economy strengthened by Long Island and Hudson Valley agriculture, in conjunction with trade and artisanal activity at the Port of New York; the colony was a breadbasket and lumberyard for the British sugar colonies in the Caribbean. New York's population grew substantially during this century: from the first colonial census (1698) to the last (1771), the province grew ninefold, from 18,067 to 168,007.

== New York in the American Revolution ==
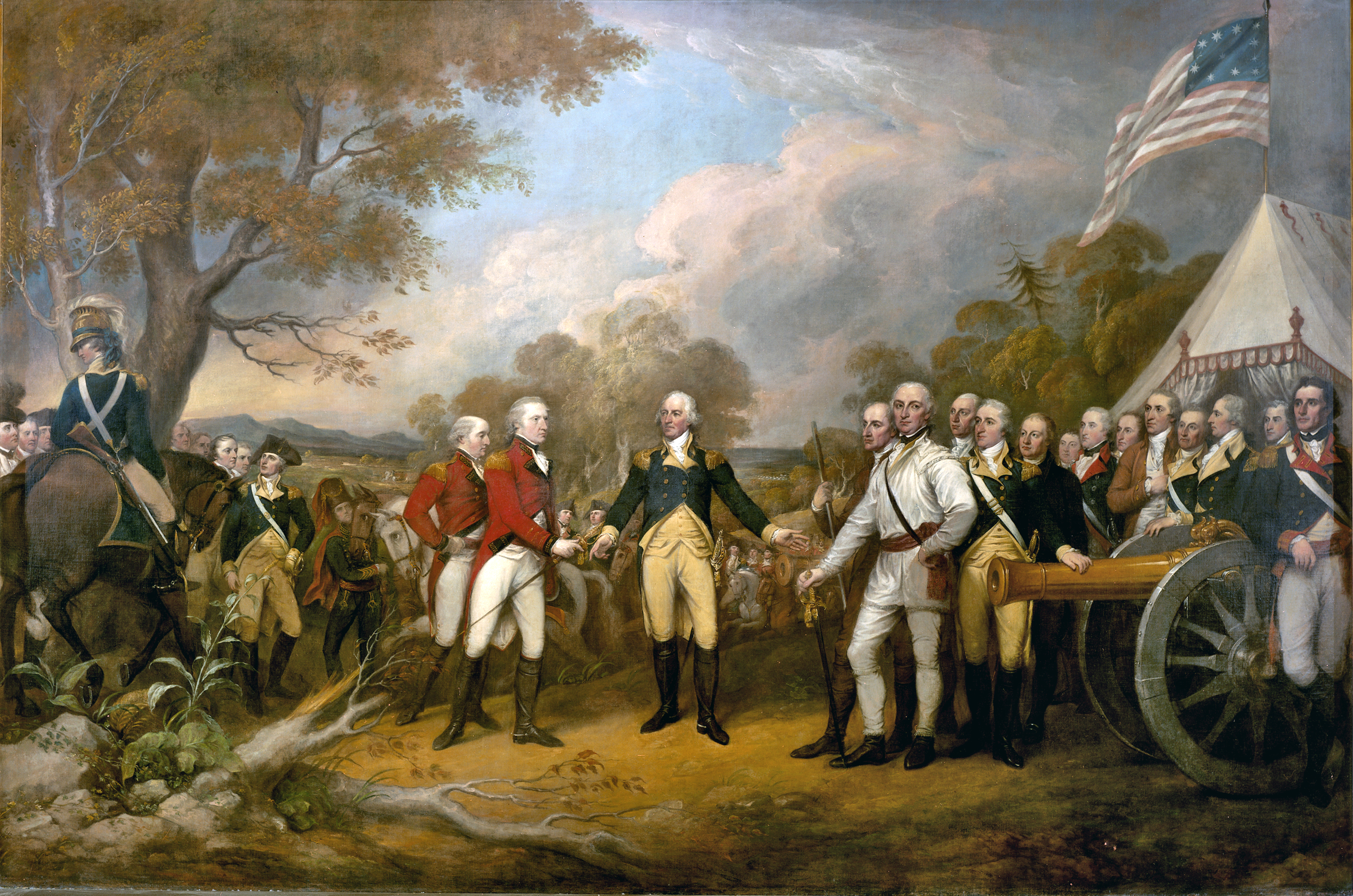
John Trumbull's Surrender of General Burgoyne stylizes the American win at Saratoga.

New York played a pivotal role in the Revolutionary War. The colony verged on revolt following the Stamp Act of 1765, advancing the New York City–based Sons of Liberty to the forefront of New York politics. The Act exacerbated the depression the province experienced after unsuccessfully invading Canada in 1760. Even though New York City merchants lost out on lucrative military contracts, the group sought common ground between the King and the people; however, compromise became impossible as of April 1775 Battles of Lexington and Concord. In that aftermath the New York Provincial Congress on June 9, 1775, for five pounds sterling for each hundredweight of gunpowder delivered to each county's committee.

Two powerful families had for decades assembled colony-wide coalitions of supporters. With few exceptions, members long associated with the DeLancey faction went along when its leadership decided to support the crown, while members of the Livingston faction became Patriots.

New York's strategic central location and port made it key to controlling the colonies; a third of the battles of the American Revolutionary War occurred in New York. In advance of the Battle of Long Island, the first major battle of the war, the British assembled a massive fleet near Staten Island. While the British won the battle, taking control of the harbor and putting New York City under military occupation, the conflict demonstrated that there would be no easy victory. After additional defeats at White Plains and Fort Washington, General George Washington barely escaped New York City with his army in November 1776; General Sir William Howe was successful in driving Washington out, but erred by expanding into New Jersey. By January 1777, he retained only a few outposts near New York City. The British held the city for the duration, using it as a base for expeditions against other targets.

In October 1777, American General Horatio Gates won the Battle of Saratoga, later regarded as the war's turning point. Had Gates not held, the rebellion might well have broken down. Losing Saratoga would have cost the entire Hudson–Champlain corridor, which would have separated New England from the rest of the colonies and split the future union.

The British Crown repeatedly requested aid from the Haudenosaunee, who were reluctant to participate in what they perceived as a civil war. Ultimately, the Haudenosaunee Confederacy was divided; the Cayuga, Mohawk, Onondaga, and Seneca honored old alliances with the British and the Oneida and Tuscarora allied with the Americans. Following the British surrender at the Battle of Saratoga, British and Indigenous leaders, including Loyalist Major John Butler, Mohawk military leader Joseph Brant, and Seneca war chiefs Sayenqueraghta and Cornplanter, led raids on frontier settlements. Following the Cherry Valley Massacre, Washington launched the Sullivan Expedition. The 1779 scorched-earth campaign destroyed 40 villages, crops, and winter stores, and forced thousands of refugees to British Fort Niagara. The Treaty of Paris, signed on September 3, 1783, formally ended the American Revolution. A month later, British ships carrying servicemen and Loyalists left New York City. For many years, November 25 was celebrated as Evacuation Day.

== Statehood to the Civil War ==
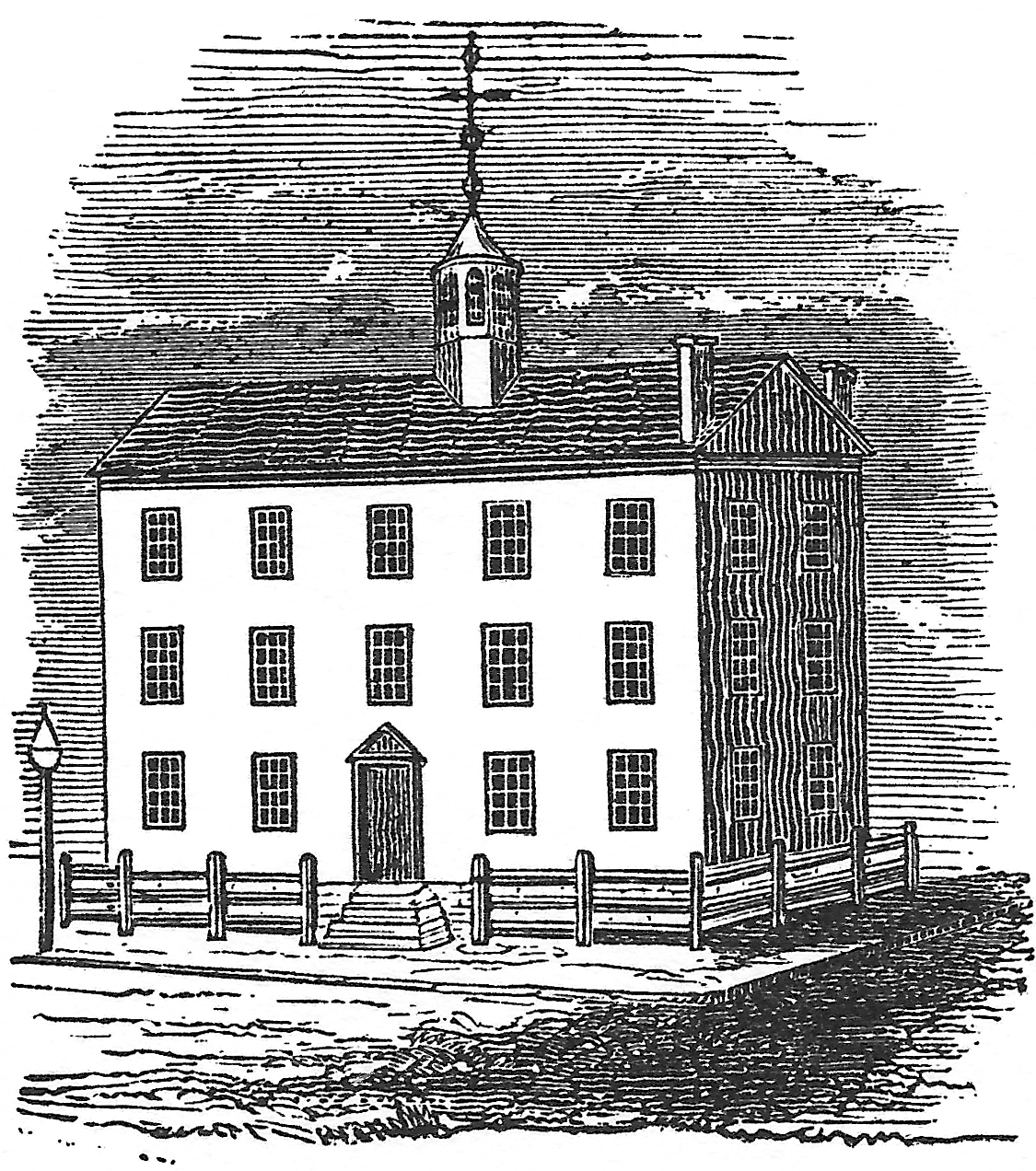
The Stadt Huys in Albany became the state's seat of government when Albany became the permanent capitol in 1797.

Upon war's end, New York's borders became well–defined: the counties east of Lake Champlain became Vermont and the state's western borders were settled by 1786.

Many Iroquois supported the British (typically fearing future American ambitions). Many were killed during the war; others went into exile with the British. Those remaining lived on twelve reservations; by 1826 only eight reservations remained, all of which survived into the 21st century.

The state adopted its constitution in April 1777, creating a strong executive and strict separation of powers. It strongly influenced the federal constitution a decade later. Debate over the federal constitution in 1787 led to formation of the groups known as Federalists—mainly "downstaters" (those who lived in or near New York City) who supported a strong national government—and Anti-Federalists—mainly upstaters (those who lived to the city's north and west) who opposed large national institutions. In 1787, Alexander Hamilton, a leading Federalist from New York and signatory to the Constitution, wrote the first essay of the Federalist Papers. He published and wrote most of the series in New York City newspapers in support of the proposed United States Constitution. Antifederalists were not swayed by the arguments, but the state ratified it in 1788.

In 1785, New York City became the national capital and continued as such on and off until 1790; George Washington was inaugurated as the first President of the United States in front of Federal Hall in 1789. The United States Bill of Rights was drafted there, and the United States Supreme Court sat for the first time. From statehood to 1797, the Legislature frequently moved the state capital between Albany, Kingston, Poughkeepsie, and New York City. Thereafter, Albany retained that role.

Map of New York dated 1814.

In the early 19th century, New York became a center for advancement in transportation. In 1807, Robert Fulton initiated a steamboat line from New York to Albany, the first successful enterprise of its kind. By 1815, Albany was the state's turnpike center, which established the city as the hub for pioneers migrating west to Buffalo and the Michigan Territory.

In 1825 the Erie Canal opened, securing the state's economic dominance. Its impact was enormous: one source stated, "Linking the Atlantic Ocean and the Great Lakes, the canal was an act of political will that joined the regions of the state, created a vast economic hinterland for New York City, and established a ready market for agricultural products from the state's interior." In that year western New York transitioned from "frontier" to settled area. By this time, all counties and most municipalities had incorporated, approximately matching the state's is organized today. In 1831, the Mohawk and Hudson Railroad started the country's first successful regularly–scheduled steam railroad service.

Advancing transportation quickly led to settlement of the fertile Mohawk and Genessee valleys and the Niagara Frontier. Buffalo and Rochester became boomtowns. Significant migration of New England "Yankees" (mainly of English descent) to the central and western parts of the state led to minor conflicts with the more settled "Yorkers" (mainly of German, Dutch, and Scottish descent). More than 15% of the state's 1850 population had been born in New England. The western part of the state grew fastest at this time. By 1840, New York was home to seven of the nation's thirty largest cities. (Note: New York City (1st at 312,710), Brooklyn (7th at 36,233), Albany (9th at 33,721), Rochester (19th at 20,191), Troy (21st at 19,334), Buffalo (22nd at 18,213), Utica (29th at 12,782).)

During this period, towns established academies for education, including for girls. The western area of the state was a center of progressive causes, including support of abolitionism, temperance, and women's rights. Religious enthusiasms flourished and the Latter Day Saint movement was founded in the area by Joseph Smith and his vision. Some supporters of abolition participated in the Underground Railroad, helping fugitive slaves reach freedom in Canada or in New York.

During the late 18th century, New York passed several gradual manumission laws, culminating in the 1799 Act for the Gradual Abolition of Slavery. Its provisions effectively resulted in the partial extension of slavery in New York through 1827. (See History of slavery in New York (state)) In the early 1840s the state legislature and Governor William H. Seward passed laws expanding and protecting the rights of African Americans against Southern slave-catchers. One guaranteed alleged fugitive slaves the right of a jury trial in New York to establish whether they were slaves, and another pledged the aid of the state to recover free blacks kidnapped into slavery, (as happened to Solomon Northup of Saratoga Springs in 1841, who did not regain freedom until 1853.) In 1841 Seward signed legislation to repeal a "nine-month law" that allowed slaveholders to bring their slaves into the state for a period of nine months before they were considered free. After this, slaves brought to the state were immediately considered freed, as was the case in some other free states. Seward also signed legislation to establish public education for all children, leaving it up to local jurisdictions as to how that would be supplied (some had segregated schools).

New York culture bloomed in the first half of the 19th century: in 1809 Washington Irving wrote the satirical A History of New York under the pen name Diedrich Knickerbocker, and in 1819 he based Rip Van Winkle and The Legend of Sleepy Hollow in Hudson Valley towns. Thomas Cole's Hudson River School was established in the 1830s by showcasing dramatic landscapes of the Hudson Valley. The first baseball teams formed in New York City in the 1840s, including the New York Knickerbockers. Professional baseball later located its Hall of Fame in Cooperstown. Saratoga Race Course, an annual summer attraction in Saratoga Springs, opened in 1847.

== New York in the American Civil War ==
A civil war was not in the best interest of business, because New York had strong ties to the Deep South, both through the port of New York and manufacture of cotton goods in upstate textile mills. Half of New York City's exports were related to cotton before the war. Southern businessmen so frequently traveled to the city that they established favorite hotels and restaurants. Trade was based on moving Southern goods. The city's large Democrat community feared the impact of Abraham Lincoln's election in 1860 and the mayor urged secession of New York.

By the time of the 1861 Battle of Fort Sumter, such political differences decreased and the state quickly met Lincoln's request for soldiers and supplies. More soldiers fought from New York than any other Northern state. While no battles were waged in New York, the state was not immune to Confederate conspiracies, including one to burn various New York cities and another to invade the state via Canada.

In January 1863, Lincoln issued the Emancipation Proclamation, which freed the slaves in states that were still in rebellion against the union. In March 1863, the federal draft law was changed so that male citizens between 20 and 35 and unmarried citizens to age 45 were subject to conscription. Those who could afford to hire a substitute or pay $300 were exempt. Antiwar newspaper editors attacked the law, and many immigrants and their descendants resented being drafted in place of people who could buy their way out. Democratic Party leaders raised the specter of a deluge of freed southern blacks competing with the white working class, then dominated by ethnic Irish and immigrants. On the lottery's first day, July 11, 1863, the first lottery draw was held. On Monday, July 13, 1863, five days of large-scale riots began, which were dominated by ethnic Irish, who targeted blacks in the city, their neighborhoods, and known abolitionist sympathizers. As a result, many blacks left Manhattan permanently, moving to Brooklyn or other areas.

== End of the Civil War to 1901 ==
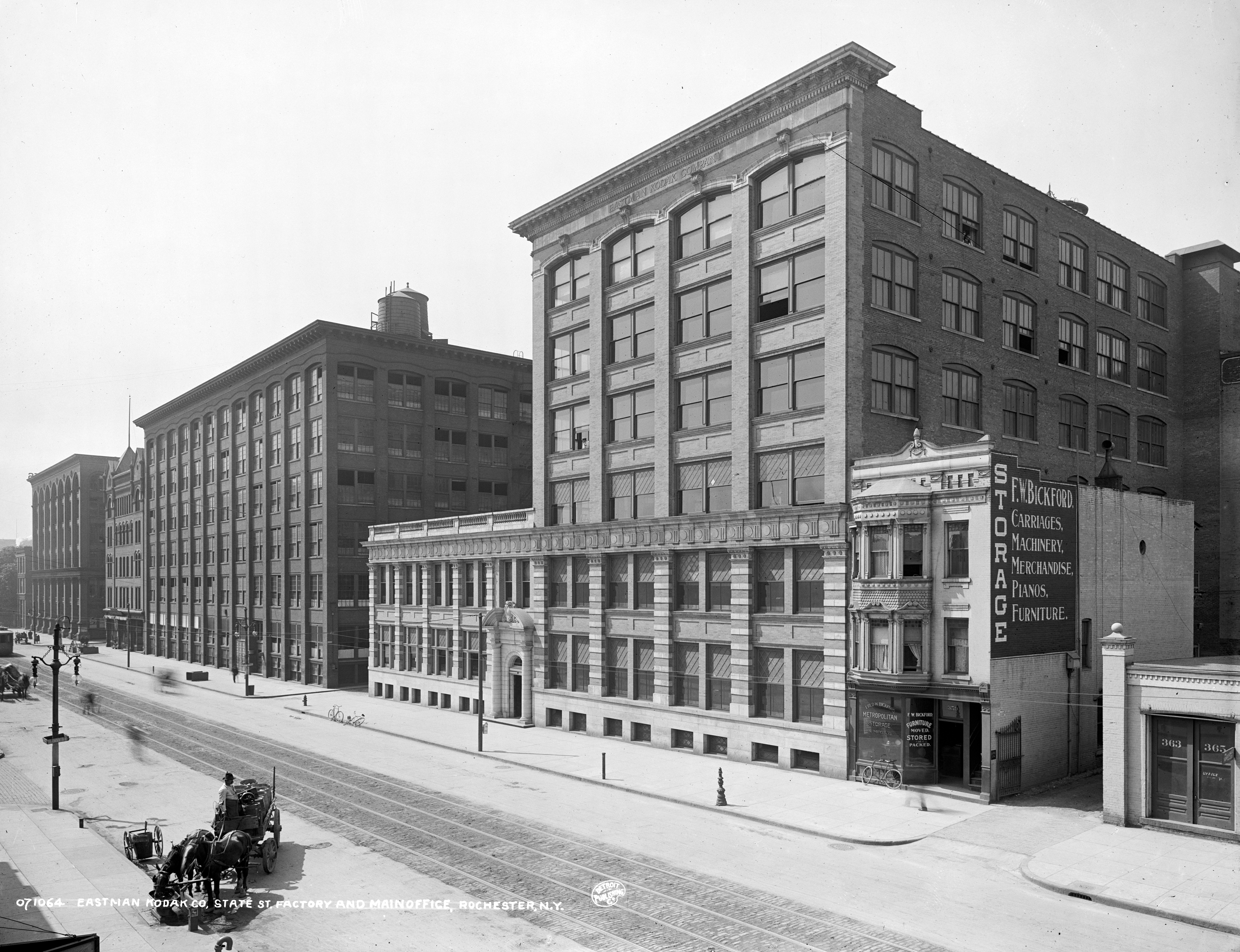
Companies such as Eastman Kodak (Rochester headquarters pictured ca. 1900) epitomized New York's manufacturing economy in the late 19th century.

In the following decades, New York strengthened its dominance of the financial and banking industries. Manufacturing continued to rise: Eastman Kodak founded in 1888 in Rochester, General Electric in Schenectady, and Endicott-Johnson Shoe Company in the Triple Cities are some of the well-known companies founded during this period. Buffalo and Niagara Falls attracted numerous factories following the advent of hydroelectric power in the area. With industry blooming, workers began to unite in New York as early as the 1820s. By 1882, the Knights of Labor in New York City had 60,000 members. Trade unions used political influence to limit working hours as early as 1867. At the same time, New York's agricultural output peaked. Focus changed from crop-based to dairy-based agriculture. The cheese industry became established in the Mohawk Valley. By 1881, the state had more than 241,000 farms. In the same period, the area around New York Harbor became the world's oyster capital, retaining that title into the early twentieth century.

Scenes showing immigrants arriving at the Immigration Depot at Ellis Island in 1906

Immigration increased throughout the latter half of the 19th century. Starting with refugees from the Great Famine of Ireland in the 1840s, New York became a prominent entry point for those seeking a new life in the United States. Between 1855 and 1890, an estimated 8 million immigrants passed through Castle Clinton at Battery Park in Manhattan. (Note: By comparison, New York's population in 1890 was just over 5 million.) Early in this period, most immigrants came from Ireland and Germany. Ellis Island opened in 1892, and between 1880 and 1920, most immigrants were German and Eastern European Jews, Poles, and other Eastern and Southern Europeans, including many Italians. By 1925, New York City's population outnumbered that of London, making it the most populous city in the world. Arguably New York's most identifiable symbol, Liberty Enlightening the World (the Statue of Liberty), a gift from France for the American centennial, was completed in 1886. By the early 20th century, the statue, designed by sculptor Frédéric Auguste Bartholdi, was regarded as the "Mother of Exiles"—a symbol of hope to immigrants.

New York's political pattern changed little after the mid–19th century. New York City and its metropolitan area was already heavily Democrat; Upstate was aligned with the Republican Party and was a center of abolitionist activists. In the 1850s, Democratic Tammany Hall became one of the most powerful and durable political machines in United States history. Boss William Tweed brought the organization to the forefront of city and then state politics in the 1860s. Based on its command of a large population, Tammany maintained influence until at least the 1930s. Outside the city, Republicans were able to influence the redistricting process enough to constrain New York City and capture control of the Legislature in 1894. Both parties have seen national political success: in the 39 presidential elections between 1856 and 2010, Republicans won 19 times and Democrats 20 times.

== 1901 through the Great Depression ==
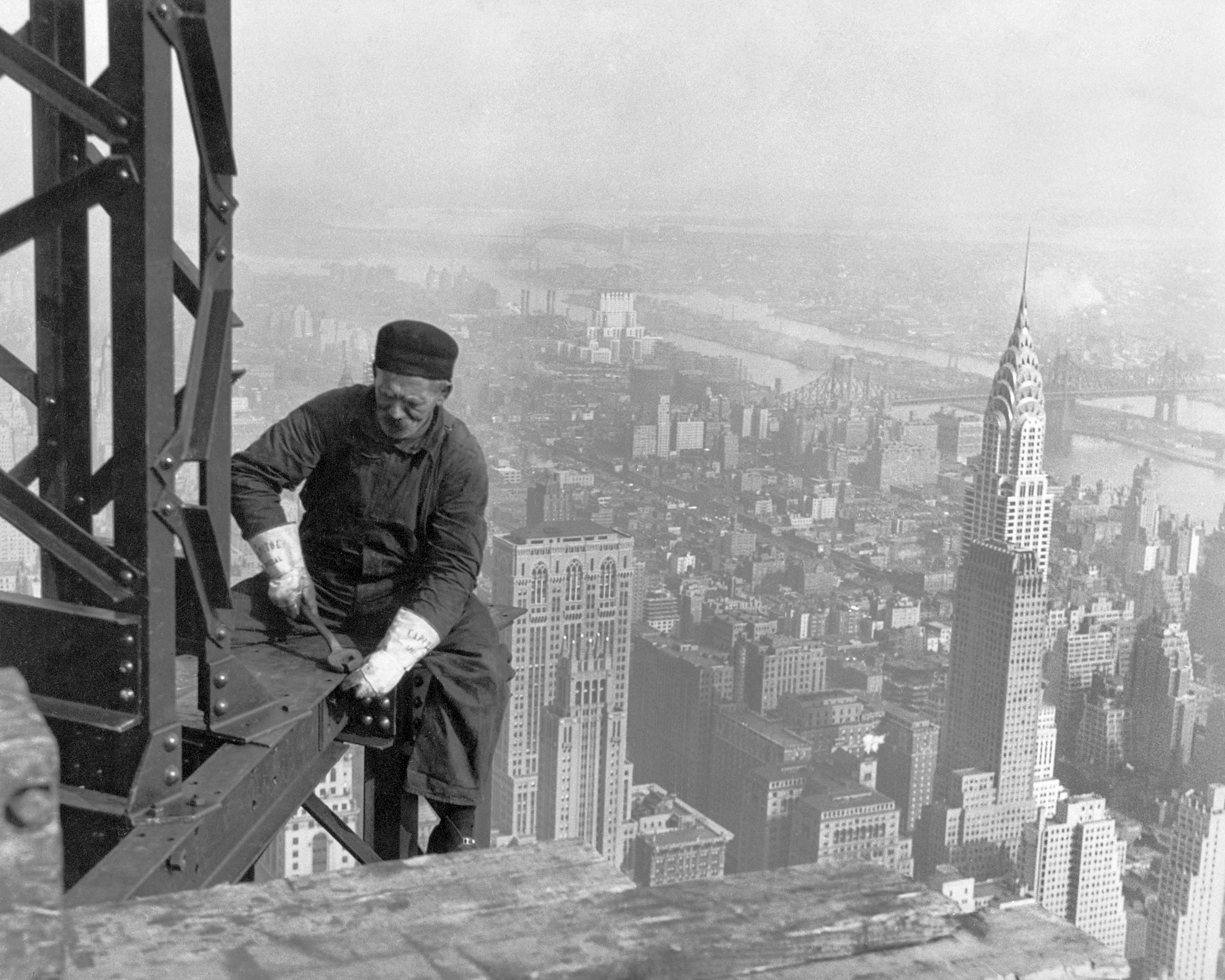
A frameworker tightens bolts on the Empire State Building in 1930; the recently completed Chrysler Building is seen in the background.

By 1901, New York was the richest and most populous state. Two years prior, the five boroughs of New York City became one city. Within decades, the city's emblem had become the skyscraper: the Woolworth Building was the tallest building in the world from 1913, surpassed by 40 Wall Street in April 1930, the Chrysler Building in 1930, the Empire State Building in 1931, and the World Trade Center in 1972 before losing the title in 1974.

The state was serviced by over a dozen major railroads and at the start of the 20th century and electric Interurban rail networks began to spring up around Syracuse, Rochester and other cities in New York during this period.

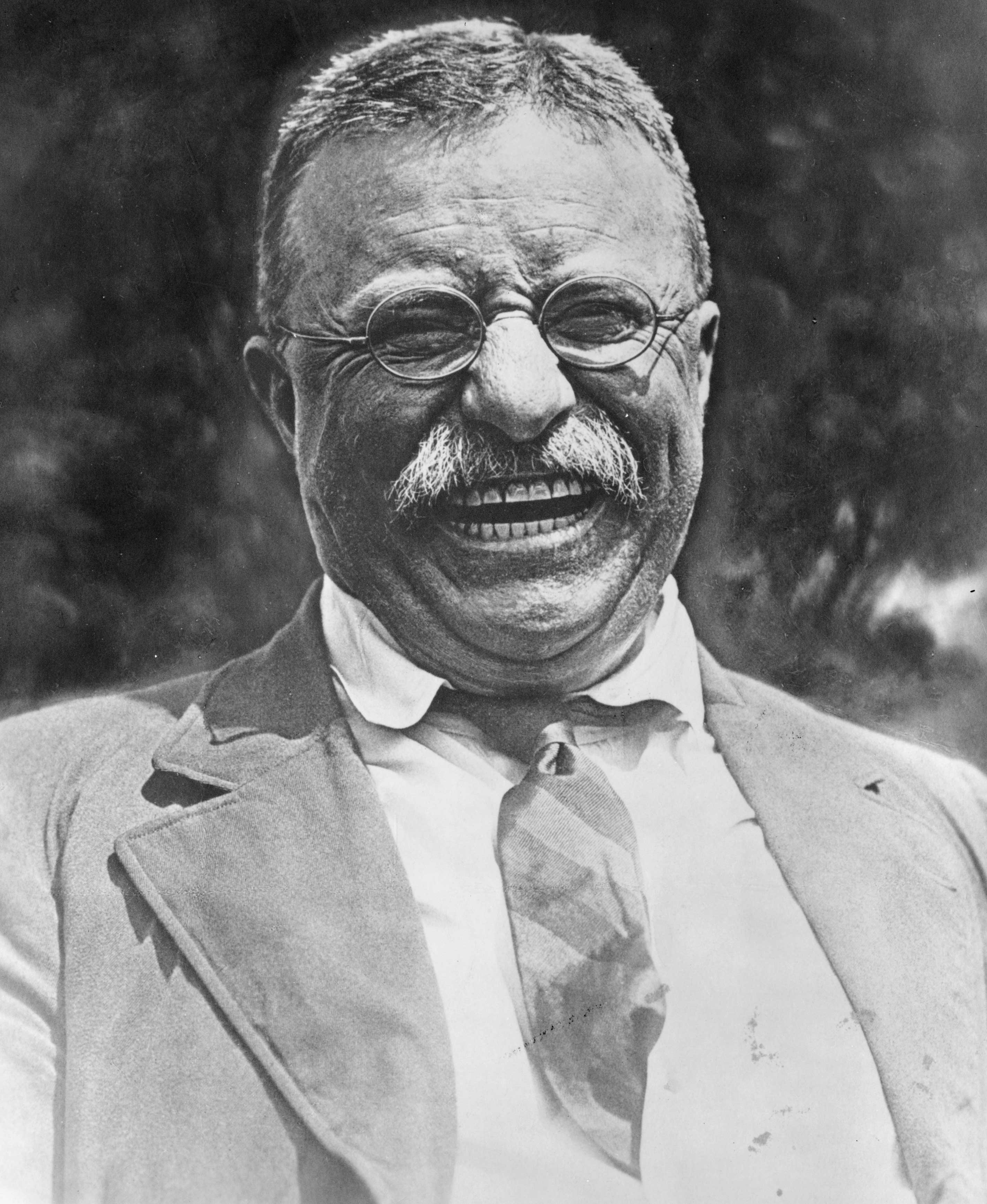
Theodore Roosevelt

In the late 1890s governor Theodore Roosevelt and fellow Republicans such as Charles Evans Hughes worked with many Democrats such as Al Smith to promote Progressivism. They battled trusts and monopolies (especially in the insurance industry), promoted efficiency, fought waste, and called for more democracy in politics. Democrats focused more on the benefits of progressivism for their own ethnic working class base and for labor unions.

Democratic political machines, especially Tammany Hall in Manhattan, opposed woman suffrage because they feared that the addition of female voters would dilute the control they had established over groups of male voters. By the time of the New York State referendum on women's suffrage in 1917, however, some wives and daughters of Tammany Hall leaders were working for suffrage, leading it to take a neutral position that was crucial to the referendum's passage.

Following a sharp but short-lived Depression at the beginning of the decade, New York enjoyed a booming economy during the Roaring Twenties. New York suffered during the Great Depression, which began with the Wall Street crash on Black Tuesday in 1929. The Securities and Exchange Commission opened in 1934 to regulate the stock market. Franklin Delano Roosevelt was elected governor in 1928, and the state faced upwards of 25% unemployment. His Temporary Emergency Relief Agency, established in 1931, was the first work relief program in the nation and influenced the national Federal Emergency Relief Administration. Roosevelt was elected President in 1932 in part because of his promises to extend New York–style relief programs across the country via his New Deal. In 1932, Lake Placid was host to the III Olympic Winter Games.

== World War II and the modern era ==
As the largest state, New York again supplied the most resources during World War II. New York manufactured 11 percent of total United States military armaments produced during the war and suffered 31,215 casualties. The war affected the state both socially and economically. For example, to overcome discriminatory labor practices, Governor Herbert H. Lehman created the Committee on Discrimination in Employment in 1941 and Governor Thomas E. Dewey signed the Ives-Quinn Act in 1945, banning employment discrimination. The G.I. Bill of 1944, which offered returning soldiers the opportunity of affordable higher education, forced New York to create a public university system since its private universities could not handle the influx; the State University of New York was created by Governor Dewey in 1948.

World War II constituted New York's last great industrial era. At its conclusion, the defense industry shrank and the economy shifted towards producing services rather than goods. Returning soldiers disproportionately displaced female and minority workers who had entered the industrial workforce only when the war left employers no other choice. Companies moved to the south and west, seeking lower taxes and a less costly, non–union workforce. Many workers followed the jobs. The middle class expanded and created suburbs such as the one on Long Island. The automobile accelerated this decentralization; planned communities like Levittown offered affordable middle-class housing.

Larger cities stopped growing around 1950. Growth resumed only in New York City, in the 1980s. Buffalo's population fell by half between 1950 and 2000. Reduced immigration and worker migration led New York State's population to decline for the first time between 1970 and 1980. California and Texas both surpassed it in population.

New York entered its third era of massive transportation projects by building highways, notably the New York State Thruway. The project was unpopular with New York City Democrats, who referred to it as "Dewey's ditch" and the "enemy of schools", because the Thruway disproportionately benefited upstate. The highway was based on the German Autobahn and was unlike anything seen at that point in the United States. It was within 30 miles (50 km) of 90% of the population at its conception. Costing $600 million, the full 427-mile (687 km) project opened in 1956.

Nelson Rockefeller was governor from 1959 to 1973 and changed New York politics. He began as a liberal, but grew more conservative: he limited SUNY's growth, responded aggressively to the Attica Prison riot, and promulgated the uniquely severe Rockefeller Drug Laws. The World Trade Center and other profligate projects nearly drove New York City into bankruptcy in 1975. The state took substantial budgetary control, which eventually led to improved fiscal prudence.

The Executive Mansion was retaken by Democrats in 1974 and remained under Democratic control for 20 years under Hugh Carey and Mario Cuomo. Late–century Democrats became more centrist, including US Senator Daniel Patrick Moynihan (1977–2001) and New York City Mayor Ed Koch (1978–1989), while state Republicans began to align themselves with the more conservative national party. They gained power through the elections of Senator Alfonse D'Amato in 1980, Mayor Rudolph Giuliani in 1993, and Governor George Pataki in 1994. New York remained one of the most liberal states. In 1984, Ronald Reagan was the last Republican to carry the state, although Republican Michael Bloomberg served as New York City mayor in the early 21st century.

== Last decades of 20th century ==
In the late 20th century, telecommunication and high technology industries employed many New Yorkers. New York City was especially successful at this transition. Entrepreneurs created many small companies, as industrial firms such as Polaroid withered. This success drew many young professionals into the still–dwindling cities. New York City was the exception and has continued to draw new residents. The energy of the city created attractions and new businesses. Some people believe that changes in policing created a less threatening environment; crime rates dropped, and urban development reduced urban decay.

This in turn led to a surge in culture. New York City became, once again, "the center for all things chic and trendy". Hip-hop and rap music, led by New York City, became the most popular pop genre. Immigration to both the city and state rose. New York City, with a large gay and lesbian community, suffered many deaths from AIDS beginning in the 1980s.

New York City increased its already large share of television programming, home to the network news broadcasts, as well as two of the three major cable news networks. The Wall Street Journal and The New York Times became two of the three "national" newspapers, read throughout the country. New York also increased its dominance of the financial services industry centered on Wall Street, led by banking expansion, a rising stock market, innovations in investment banking, including junk bond trading and accelerated by the savings and loan crisis that decimated competitors elsewhere in New York.

Upstate did not fare as well as downstate; the major industries that began to reinvigorate New York City did not typically spread to other regions. The number of farms in the state had fallen to 30,000 by 1997. City populations continued to decline while suburbs grew in area, but did not increase proportionately in population. High-tech industry grew in cities such as Corning and Rochester. Overall New York entered the new millennium "in a position of economic strength and optimism".

== 21st century (2001–present day) ==
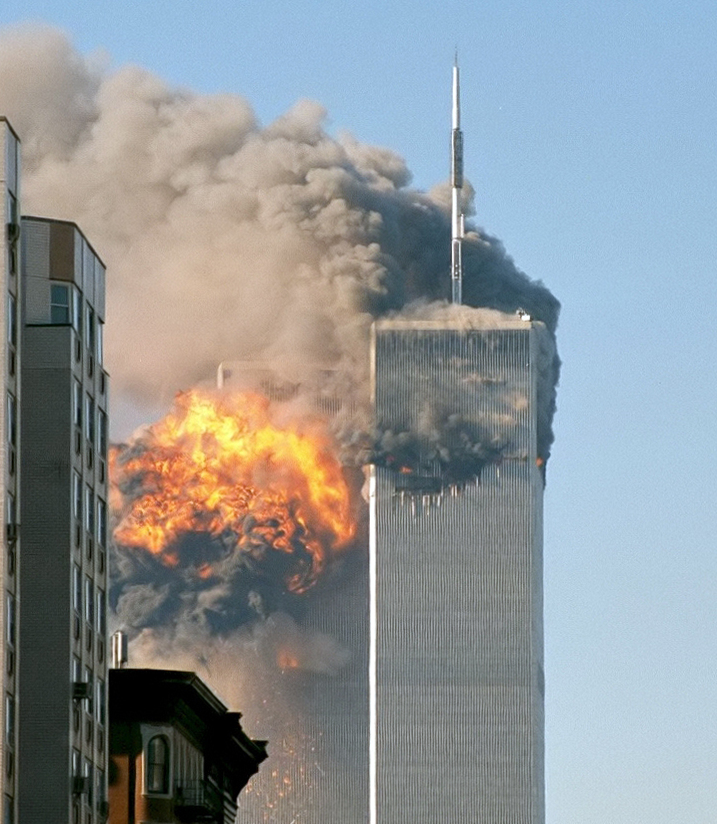
United Airlines Flight 175 crashes into the South Tower of the World Trade Center during the September 11 attacks.

In 2001, New York entered a new era following the 9/11 attacks, the worst terrorist attack ever to take place on American soil. Two of the four hijacked passenger jets crashed into the Twin Towers of the World Trade Center, destroying them, and killing almost 3,000 people. One flew into the Pentagon demolishing the walls. The final one was almost taken back over by the passengers aboard and crashed into an open grassland with 296 out of the 500 people dead. Thousands of New Yorkers volunteered their time to search the ruin for survivors and remains in the following weeks.

Following the attacks, plans were announced to rebuild the World Trade Center site. 7 World Trade Center became the first World Trade Center skyscraper to be rebuilt in five years after the attacks. One World Trade Center, four more office towers, and a memorial to the casualties of the September 11 attacks are under construction as of 2011. One World Trade Center opened on November 3, 2014.

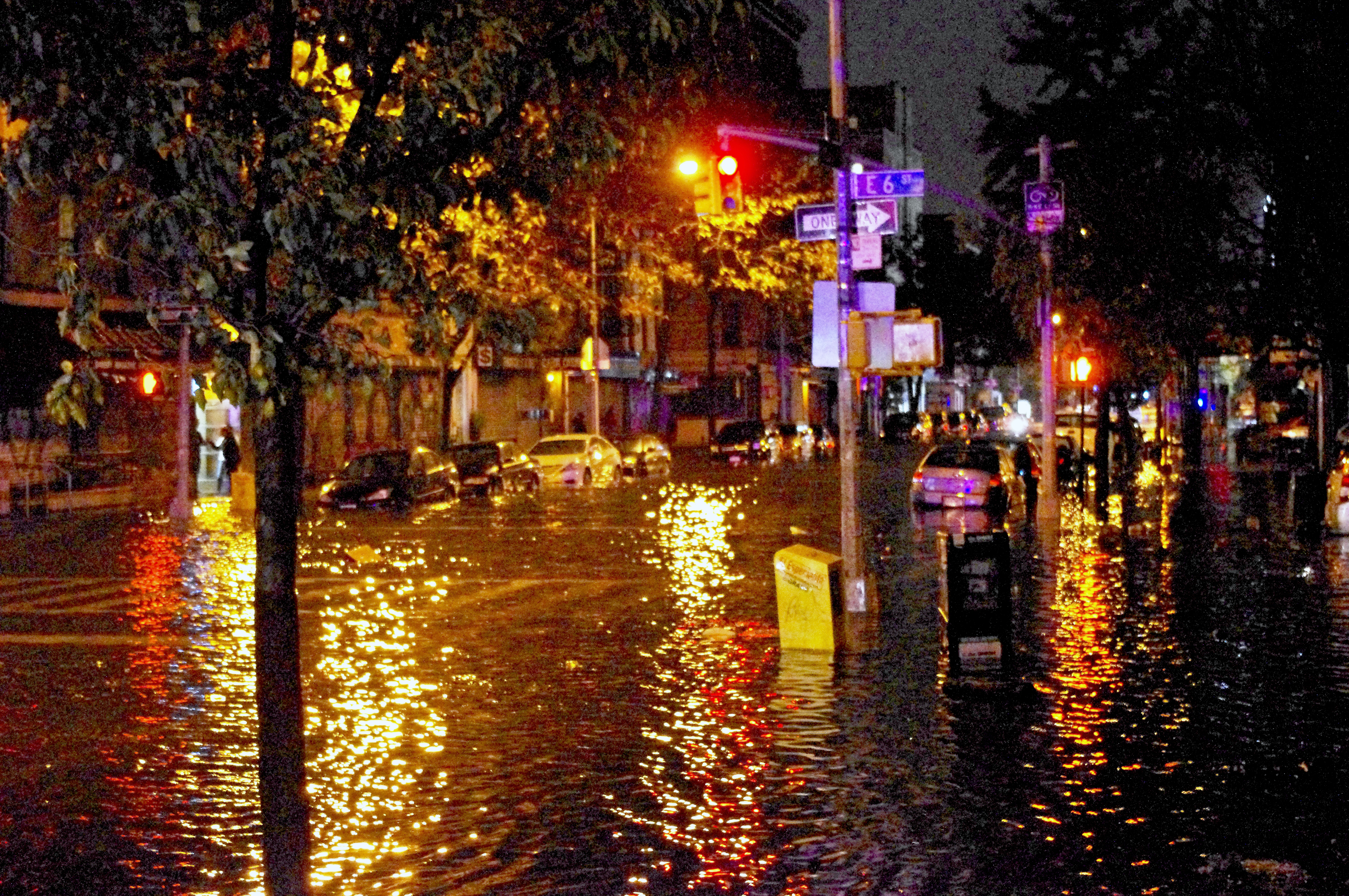
Flooding on Avenue C in Lower Manhattan caused by Hurricane Sandy.

On October 29 and 30, 2012, Hurricane Sandy caused extensive destruction of the state's shorelines, ravaging portions of New York City, Long Island, and southern Westchester with record-high storm surge, with severe flooding and high winds causing power outages for hundreds of thousands of New Yorkers, and leading to gasoline shortages and disruption of mass transit systems. The storm and its profound effects have prompted the discussion of constructing seawalls and other coastal barriers around the shorelines of New York City and Long Island to minimize the risk from another such future event. Such risk is considered highly probable due to global warming and rising sea levels.

== See also ==
- Historical outline of New York
- History of New York City
- History of the mid-Atlantic states
- List of historical societies in New York (state)

== Bibliography ==
- Broxmeyer, Jeffrey D. Electoral Capitalism: The Party System in New York's Gilded Age. of Pennsylvania Press, 2020) covers city and state.
- Curran, Robert Emmett, ed. Shaping American Catholicism: Maryland and New York, 1805–1915 (2012) excerpt and text search
- Dearstyne, Bruce W., The Spirit of New York: Defining Events in the Empire State's History (Albany: Excelsior Editions, 2015). xxiv, 359 pp.
- Eisenstadt, Peter, ed. (2005). The Encyclopedia of New York State. Syracuse, New York: Syracuse University Press. ISBN 0-8156-0808-X.
- Ellis, David M.; James A. Frost; Harold C. Syrett; Harry J. Carman (1967) [1957]. A History of New York State. Ithaca, New York: Cornell University Press. ISBN 9780801401183. LCCN 67020587..
- Fox, Dixon Ryan. The decline of aristocracy in the politics of New York (1918) online.
- Ingalls, Robert P. Herbert H. Lehman and New York's Little New Deal (1975) on 1930s online
- Kammen, Michael (1996) [1975]. Colonial New York: a History. New York City: Oxford University Press. ISBN 0-19-510779-9.
- Klein, Milton M. (ed.) and the New York State Historical Association (2001). The Empire State: A History of New York. Ithaca, New York: Cornell University Press. ISBN 0-8014-3866-7.
- Otterness, Philip. Becoming German: The 1709 Palatine Migration to New York (2004) 235 pp.
- Pessen, Edward. "A Variety of Panaceas: The 'Social Problem' and Proposed Solutions To It in Mid–Nineteenth Century New York State" New York History (1978) 59#2 pp. 198–222 online, Examines numerous statistics to show the state's leadership in wealth and prosperity.
- Wesser, Robert F. A response to progressivism: the Democratic Party and New York politics, 1902-1918 (1986) online

=== Regions and cities ===
- Burrows, Edwin G. and Mike Wallace. Gotham: A History of New York City to 1898 (1998), 1300 of highly detailed scholarly history
- Goldman, Mark. High Hopes: The Rise and Decline of Buffalo, New York (Suny Press, 1983)
- McEneny, John (2006). Albany, Capital City on the Hudson: An Illustrated History. Sun Valley, California: American Historical Press. ISBN 1-892724-53-7.
