= Area code 585 =

Telephone area code for Rochester, New York

Coordinates: 42.91°N 77.81°W

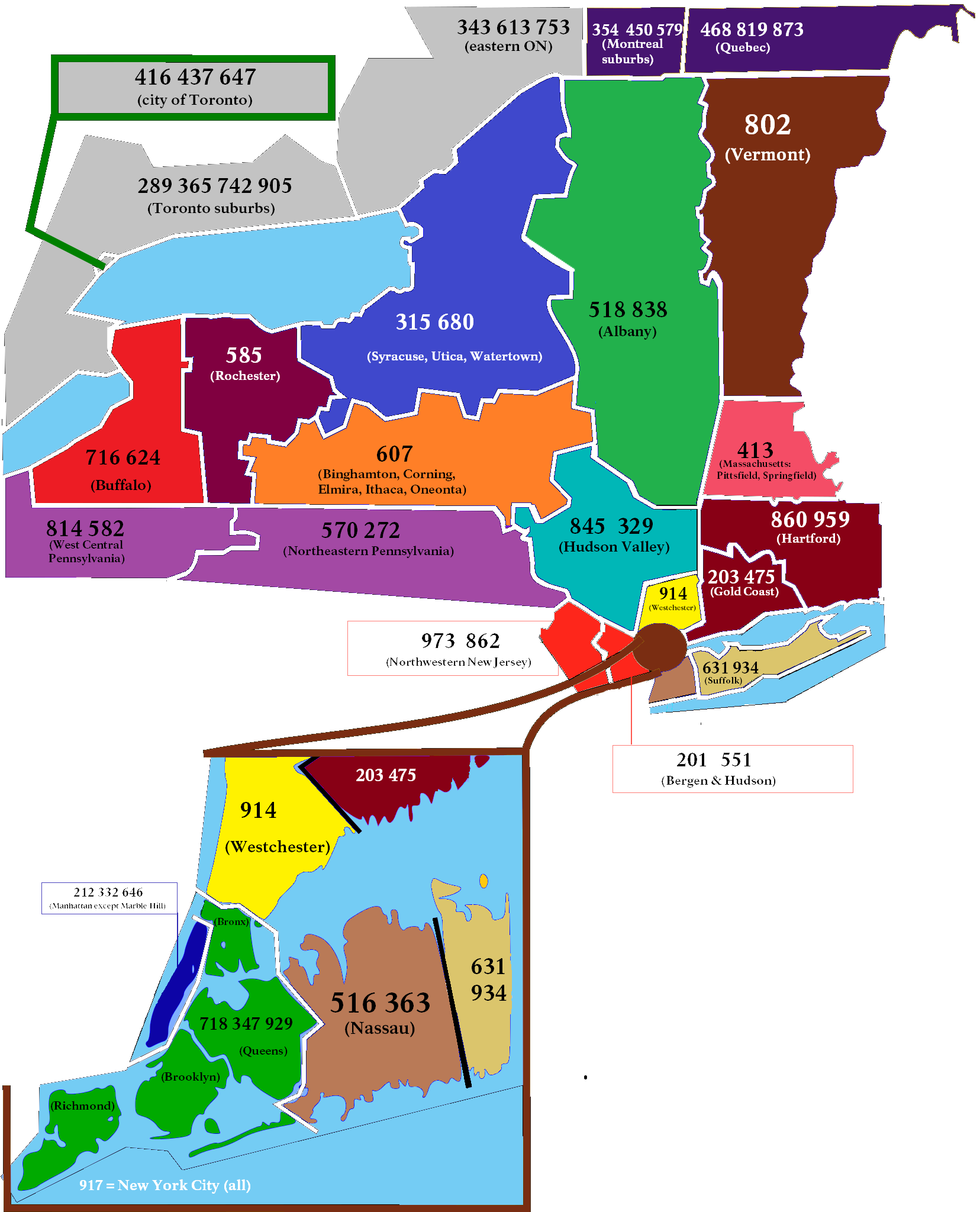
Area codes in New York state; area code 585 highlighted in maroon

Area code 585 is the telephone area code in the North American Numbering Plan for the city of Rochester and eight surrounding counties in Western New York state. The area code was activated on November 15, 2001, when the numbering plan area of area code 716 was reduced in geographic reach in an area code split. Previously, Rochester had shared 716 with Buffalo. Aside from new area codes created in the New York City metropolitan area and Long Island, 585 was the second new area code in the state since 1954, having been preceded by 845 in 2000.

The border between 716 and 585 roughly matches county lines. Therefore, some ZIP codes have telephone numbers in two area codes. A significant part of Ontario County uses area codes 315 and 680. Part of the town of Farmington is north of the NY Thruway (Interstate 90), and is "joined" with Wayne County in the 315/680 area code.

As of October 2023, the area code is not expected to require relief until at least 2029.

== Service area ==
=== Counties ===
- Genesee
- Livingston
- Monroe
- Ontario
- Orleans
- Wyoming
- Allegany
- Wayne (Limited to very small areas of Macedon, Walworth, Ontario).
- Steuben (extreme northwest part of the county, Cohocton and Wayland as well as the respective towns surrounding these villages)

=== Major communities ===
- Albion
- Batavia
- Canandaigua
- Geneseo
- Medina
- Rochester
- Victor

== See also ==
- List of New York area codes
- List of North American Numbering Plan area codes

New York area codes: 212/332/646, 315/680, 363/516, 518/838, 585, 607, 631/934, 624/716, 347/718/929, 329/845, 914, 917
	North: 289/905, Ontario	
West: 624/716	585	East: 315/680, 607
	South: 814/582, Pennsylvania	
Ontario area codes: 416/437/647/942, 519/226/548/382, 613/343/753, 705/249/683, 807, 905/289/365/742
Pennsylvania area codes: 215/267/445, 412, 570/272, 610/484/835, 717/223, 724, 814/582, 878
