= Connecticut Board of Regents for Higher Education =

Government body in Connecticut, US

The Board of Regents for Higher Education (BOR) is a government body in the U.S. state of Connecticut that oversees the Connecticut State Colleges & Universities (CSCU). CSCU and the BOR were created on July 1, 2011, consolidating the governance of the state's twelve community colleges, four state universities (but not the public University of Connecticut, which is governed separately), and Charter Oak State College. The BOR assumed the powers and responsibilities of the respective former boards of trustees and the Board for State Academic Awards; it also retains many responsibilities for setting statewide policy of the former Board of Governors for Higher Education.

== Board composition ==
The BOR consists of 22 members who are Connecticut community leaders and reflect the state's geographic, racial and ethnic diversity. Voting members are not employed by or serve as a member of aboard of trustees for any independent institution of higher education in Connecticut or the Board of Trustees of the University of Connecticut. Voting board members may not be employed by or be elected officials of any public governing body during their term of membership on the Board of Regents for Higher Education. Nine members of the board are appointed by the governor of Connecticut. Four members of the board are appointed by the majority and minority leaders of both houses of the Connecticut General Assembly. The chairperson and vice-chairperson of the student advisory committee serve as members of the board. The Commissioners of Education, Economic and Community Development and Public Health and the Labor Commissioner serve as ex officio nonvoting members of the board. Beginning in October 2013, the chairperson and vice-chairperson of the faculty advisory committee joined the board as ex officio non-voting members.

=== Board chairs ===
Board of Regents Chairperson
Name	Term start	Term end	Ref.
Lewis J. Robinson, Jr.	July 21, 2011	August 1, 2013	
Nicholas M. Donofrio	December 12, 2013	July 1, 2016	
Matt Fleury	July 1, 2016	July 30, 2022	
JoAnn Ryan	June 30, 2022	June 30, 2024	
Marty Guay	June 12, 2024	May 18, 2026 (Note: Resigned under pressure from Governor Lamont.)	
Ari Santiago	May 22, 2026	Present (Note: Interim chair following resignation of Chair Guay.)	

== Board chancellor and staff ==
The chancellor of the Board of Regents serves as the chief executive officer of the Board of Regents for Higher Education, who administers, coordinates, and supervises the activities of the board in accordance with the policies established by the board. The president has responsibilities for:

1. implementing the policies and directives of the board and any additional responsibilities as the board may prescribe,
2. implementing the goals identified and recommendations made by the Planning Commission for Higher Education
3. Building interdependent support among the Connecticut State Universities, Connecticut State Community College, and Charter Oak State College
4. balancing central authority with institutional differentiation, autonomy, and creativity, and
5. facilitating cooperation and synergy among the Connecticut State Universities, the community colleges, and Charter Oak State College.

An executive staff, under the direction of the president, is responsible for the operation of the Board of Regents for Higher Education. The board establishes terms and conditions of employment of its staff, prescribes their duties, and fixes the compensation of its professional and technical personnel. Upon recommendation of the president, the Board of Regents has appointed a vice-president for the community colleges and a vice-president for the state universities with duties that include oversight of academic programs, student support services, and institutional support.

=== Executives ===
See Connecticut State University System#Executives for the list of executives of what is now the Connecticut State Colleges and Universities (CSCU) system.

== Institutions ==
State community colleges: Asnuntuck Community College, Capital Community College, Gateway Community College, Housatonic Community College, Manchester Community College, Middlesex Community College, Naugatuck Valley Community College, Northwestern Connecticut Community College, Norwalk Community College, Quinebaug Valley Community College, Three Rivers Community College, Tunxis Community College

State universities: Central Connecticut State University, Eastern Connecticut State University, Southern Connecticut State University, Western Connecticut State University

State college (online): Charter Oak State College

== Proposals ==
In December 2015, the board proposed that criminal convictions be considered in employment decisions concerning professors in the university system. The proposed change came after Connecticut State Senator Kevin Witkos called for accountability after a Central Connecticut State University professor, Ravi Shankar, received a raise while serving time in prison over multiple criminal convictions.

In October 2017, the board unveiled a proposal dubbed "Students First" to consolidate management of the twelve community colleges under a single accreditation to become the Community College of Connecticut. Various back office functions, such as facilities, financial aid, fiscal affairs, human resources, information technology, and institutional research were also planned for consolidation. The proposal was rejected by the New England Association of Schools and Colleges-Commission on Higher Education (NEASC-CIHE), the colleges' accreditor, although the commission left open the possibility of pursuing the plan as a new institution. Five years later, in 2022, the New England Commission of Higher Education accepted CSCU's substantive change proposal, giving the system the green light to proceed with the plans to merge Connecticut's 12 legacy community colleges. In 2023, the commission granted Connecticut State Community College (CT State or CSCC) initial accreditation as a new singly-accredited comprehensive community college and now the largest community college in New England. The combined institution includes the roughly 70,000 students at its twelve predecessor institutions with over 300 academic programs offered across its statewide branch and satellite campuses.
