= Hartford–Springfield =

Greater Hartford–Springfield
- Conurbation
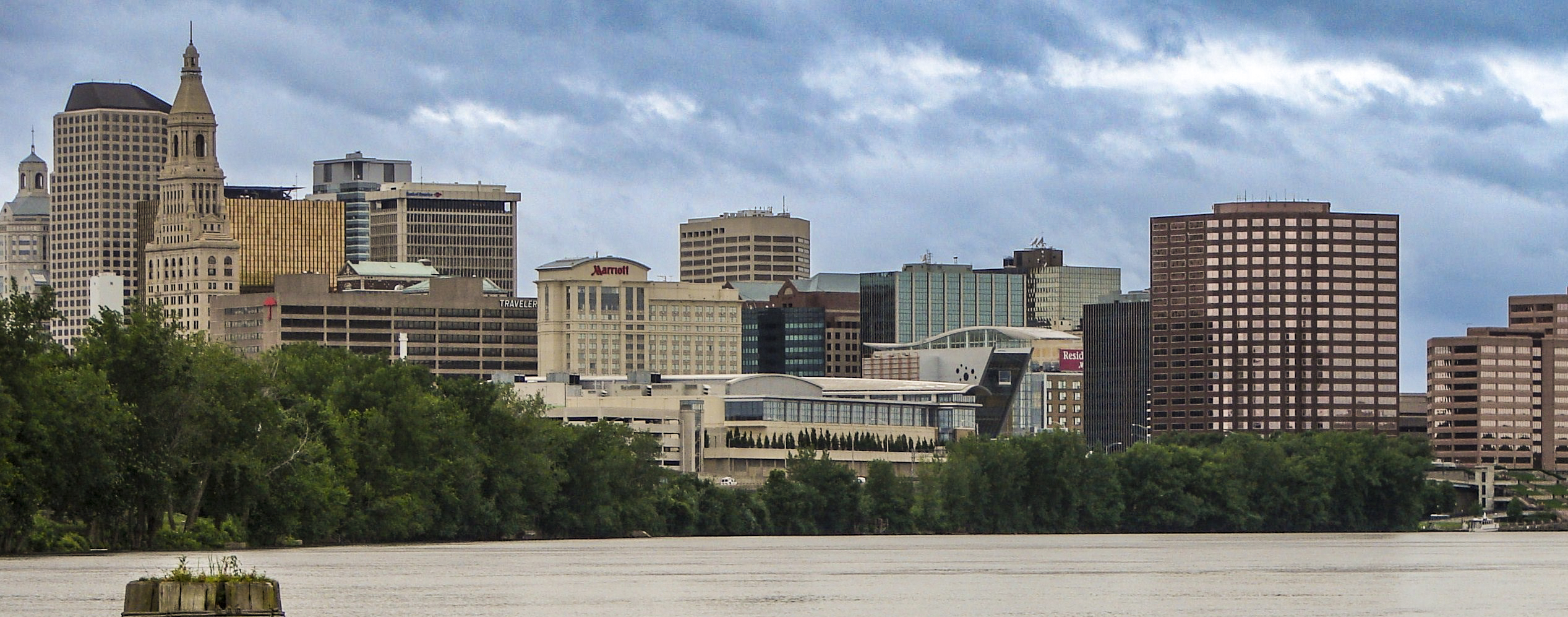
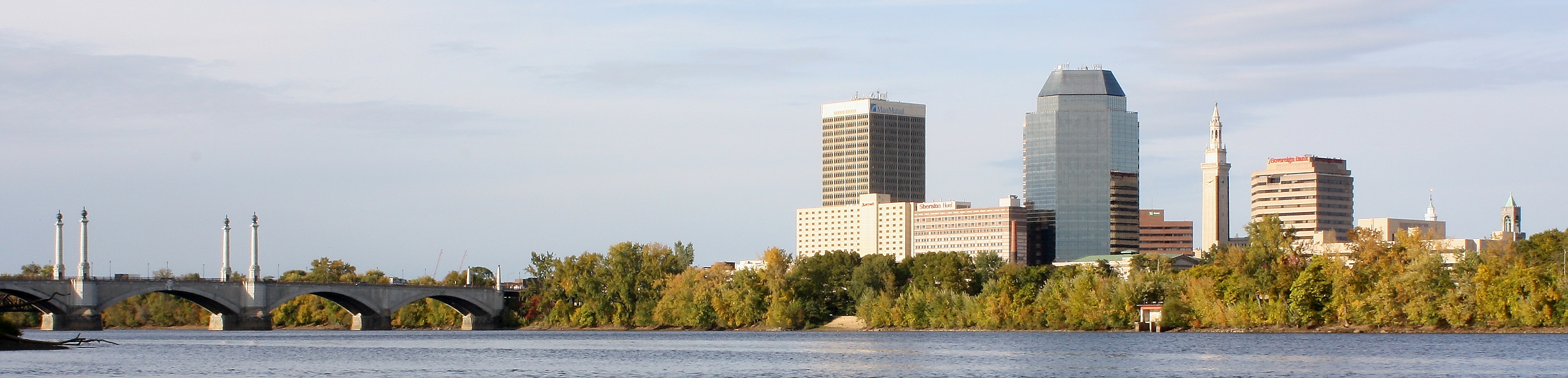
- Top to bottom: a view of Hartford as seen from East Hartford; a portion of Springfield's skyline, as seen from West Springfield
- Country: United States
- State: Connecticut; Massachusetts
- Subregions: Greater Hartford; Springfield Metropolitan Area
- Counties: Massachusetts: Franklin County; Hampden County; Hampshire County; Connecticut: Hartford County; Middlesex County; New London County; Tolland County

Area
  - Seven-county: 4,092 sq mi (10,600 km^{2})

Population (2020)
  - Seven-county: 2,162,136
  - Density: 533/sq mi (206/km^{2})
- Time zone: UTC−05:00 (Eastern)
  - Summer (DST): UTC−04:00 (PDT)
- Area codes: 413, 860/959

The greater Hartford–Springfield area is an urban region and surrounding suburban areas that encompasses both north-central Connecticut and the southern Connecticut River Valley in western Massachusetts; its major city centers are Springfield, Massachusetts, and Hartford, Connecticut.

The area is also sometimes called the Knowledge Corridor, initially employed as a 2012 rename ("New England's Knowledge Corridor") for the Hartford–Springfield Economic Partnership, an interstate cooperative venture to foster an economic, cultural, and civic partnership between the two major cities on the Connecticut River. The term Knowledge Corridor has gained a degree of currency, mostly with some government organizations as well as local businesses and universities using the name. The New Haven–Springfield Line and Connecticut River Line form the primary rail route through the region, and are sometimes themselves called the Knowledge Corridor in planning documents.

The Hartford–Springfield region is New England's second-most populous conurbation after Greater Boston, with approximately 1.9 million residents and 160,000 university students. The region also features "a dense concentration" of hospitals and over 29 universities and liberal arts colleges, including a large number of the United States' most prestigious higher-education institutions. The Knowledge Corridor includes surrounding cities such as Northampton and Amherst in the north, and New Britain and Middletown in the south.

Hartford and Springfield's urban cores lie only 23.9 miles (38.5 km) apart; however, their efforts to cooperate have long been hampered by state border issues, beginning with a lawsuit in 1638. Hartford's Bradley International Airport is the closest airport, which sits equidistant between them in Windsor Locks, Connecticut. The Hartford–Springfield Knowledge Corridor Partnership was formalized by regional civic, business, and education leaders in 2000 at the Big E in West Springfield.

== History ==
Since their respective foundings in 1635 and 1636, Hartford and Springfield have possessed a common Connecticut River heritage – both were among the original four settlements of the Connecticut Colony; however, an early legal dispute between two of the cities' Founding Fathers led the settlements to side with different colonies. In 1638, Springfield founder William Pynchon became embroiled in a legal dispute with one of the Connecticut Colony's leading citizens, Captain John Mason. Mason charged Pynchon—and the settlement of Springfield—with dominating the corn and beaver pelt trade with the Natives, to the detriment of Hartford and the Connecticut Colony. The dispute, which Pynchon and Springfield lost in 1638, led to Springfield's annexing itself to Massachusetts instead of aligning with its more geographically and ideologically compatible neighbor, Connecticut. Only since the early 2000s have Hartford and Springfield – the two great cities on the Connecticut River – started to collaborate closely, i.e. as the Knowledge Corridor Partnership.

Both Hartford and Springfield were prosperous from the early 19th century through the 1960s as cultural, technological, and industrial centers. Hartford became the center of the United States' insurance industry, while Springfield became the United States' first epicenter of precision manufacturing, producing innovations like America's first gasoline-powered car, motorcycle, and commercial radio station, among many others. Both cities were especially wealthy – at one point in the late 1800s, they were the two wealthiest cities per capita in the United States. Both cities still feature Victorian architecture built during that period.

During the mid-20th century, both Hartford and Springfield experienced a loss of manufacturing during economic restructuring. The growth of the highway system—in particular Interstate 91—engendered white flight to the suburbs, where a disproportionate amount of both cities' wealthy citizens live, (e.g., in Longmeadow, Massachusetts and West Hartford, Connecticut). During the 1960s and 1970s, the Connecticut River was polluted and Interstate 91 was built along both riverfronts – slicing through existing neighborhoods. During this period Hartford, which had historically always been slightly more populous than Springfield, hemorrhaged residents. By 1960, Springfield had become more populous than Hartford, and remains more populous as of 2011. During the 1990s, Hartford and Springfield established a professional hockey partnership, as the Springfield American Hockey League team (first the Indians and then the Falcons) served as the development affiliate of the National Hockey League's Hartford Whalers.

Since 2000, both cities have seen an increase in public and private investment, and a general increase in culture, vitality, and civic pride. The Knowledge Corridor high-speed intercity rail line is one such project, intended to unite the region and ease residents' dependence on Interstate 91. Also, both cities are pursuing different strategies to reconnect with the Connecticut River for economic and recreational opportunities.

=== Complementary strengths ===
For decades after the decline of New England manufacturing, Hartford and Springfield competed for similar businesses. During the early 1990s, a former Springfield mayor even went so far as to launch a campaign for Hartford businesses to "leave Hartford behind" for Springfield, touting Springfield's "quality of life". Since the two cities started to work collaboratively in 2000, both Hartford and Springfield have consciously defined themselves in different but complementary ways, like Raleigh–Durham, Minneapolis–Saint Paul or Dallas–Fort Worth. Both cities still feature many of the same strengths (e.g., prestigious universities and healthcare centers); however, Hartford is increasingly being defined as the Knowledge Corridor's business center, with its postmodern skyline, numerous corporate headquarters, government district, and relatively wider main thoroughfares, while Springfield is being defined as the Knowledge Corridor's recreational center, with numerous amusements for both children and adults; renovated, human-scale Victorian architecture; and a walkable, lively Metro Center. Journalists note that the Springfield features culture that far outsizes its metropolitan population of 1.9 million (see below). In 2018 the MGM company opened the MGM Springfield a destination resort casino in with over 2 million square feet of hotel, casino, shopping, and amenities in Springfield. The construction project involved the restoration of a number of historic buildings that had been damaged in the 2011 New England tornado outbreak.

== Economy ==
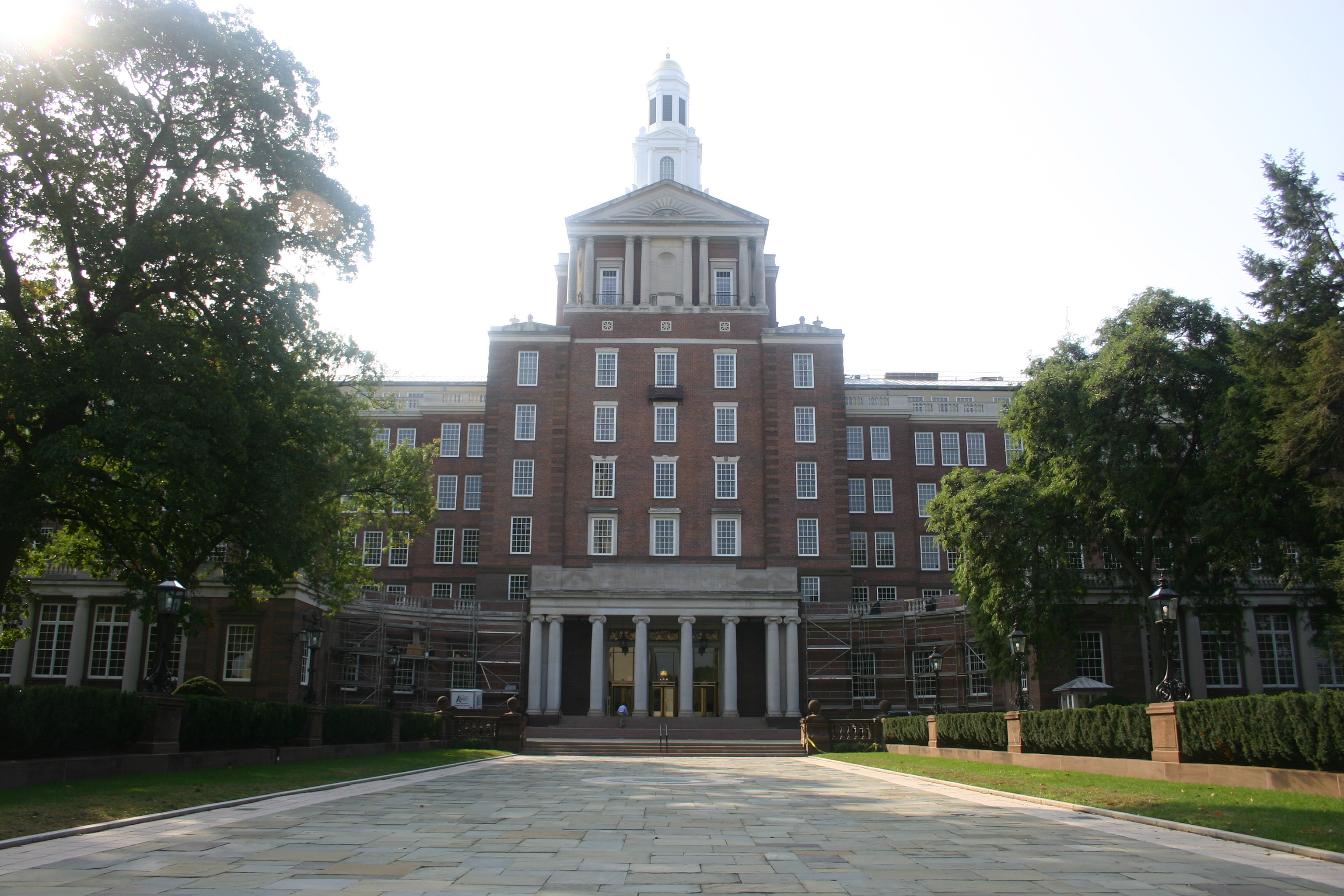
The Aetna headquarters in Hartford

The Hartford–Springfield area has a workforce of 1.1 million people and over 41,000 businesses. It is home to six Fortune 500 Companies. Its two major cities, Hartford and Springfield, have a combined GDP exceeding $100 billion per year, more than 16 U.S. states. This figure does not include the smaller cities and towns of the "Knowledge Corridor", (e.g., Northampton, Massachusetts and Middletown, Connecticut) but only the two principal cities.

As of its tenth anniversary in 2010, the Knowledge Corridor Partnership has been cited for both increasing jobs and keeping jobs in the Hartford–Springfield region, e.g. Eppendorf in Enfield, Connecticut, brought over 200 jobs to the Corridor, and MassMutual in Springfield brought over 300 new jobs. It is reported that "officials in Connecticut don’t get jealous if they lose a prospect to Massachusetts and vice versa... Because, if the [cities] weren't working together, these companies wouldn't even consider us."

=== Notable companies ===
- Aetna – Hartford, CT
- American Hockey League – Springfield, MA
- American Saw and Manufacturing Company – East Longmeadow, MA
- Baystate Health – Springfield, MA
- Big Y – Springfield, MA
- Carrier Corporation – Farmington, CT
- Cigna – Bloomfield, CT
- Colt's Manufacturing Company – West Hartford, CT
- Commonwealth Coast Conference – Springfield, MA
- Ensign-Bickford Aerospace & Defense Company – Simsbury, CT
- ESPN – Bristol, CT
- Eversource Energy – Berlin, CT
- Friendly Ice Cream Corporation – Wilbraham, MA
- Gerber Scientific – South Windsor, CT
- Hamilton Sundstrand – Windsor Locks, CT
- The Hartford – Hartford, CT
- Hartford Steam Boiler Inspection and Insurance Company – Hartford, CT
- Kaman Aircraft – Bloomfield, CT
- Lego - Enfield, CT
- Massachusetts Green High Performance Computing Center – Holyoke, MA
- MassMutual Financial Services – Springfield, MA
- Merriam Webster – Springfield, MA
- Otis Elevator – Farmington, CT
- Peter Pan Bus – Springfield, MA
- The Phoenix Companies – Hartford, CT
- Pratt-Whitney – East Hartford, CT
- Smith & Wesson – Springfield, MA
- The Stanley Works – New Britain, CT
- Travelers Insurance – Hartford, CT
- UnitedHealth Group#UnitedHealthcare – Hartford, CT, Rocky Hill, CT, and Windsor, CT
- United Technologies – Farmington, CT
- XL Group – Hartford, CT
- Yankee Candle – South Deerfield, MA

== Higher education institutions ==
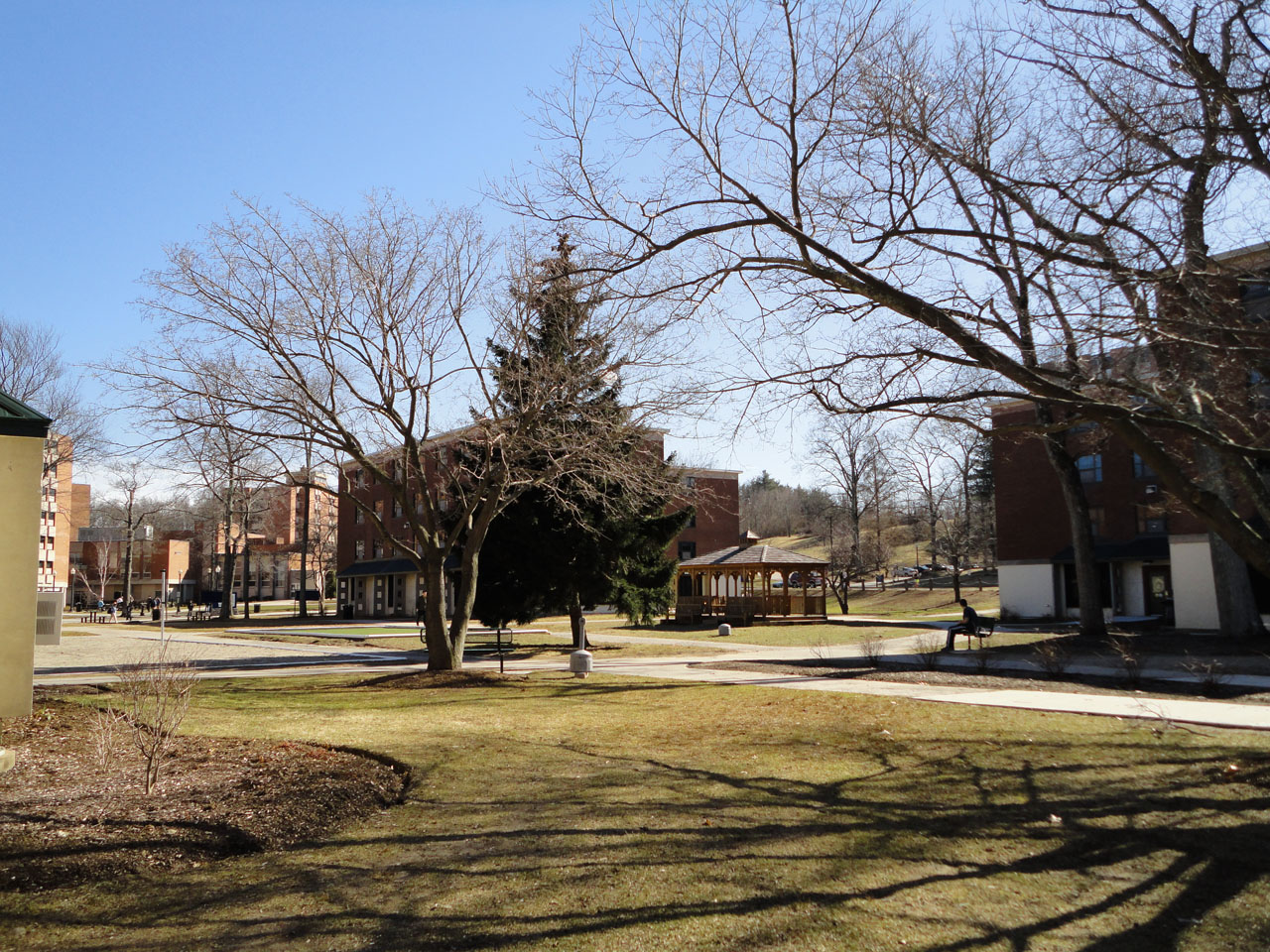
UConn dormitories, located 20 miles east of Hartford

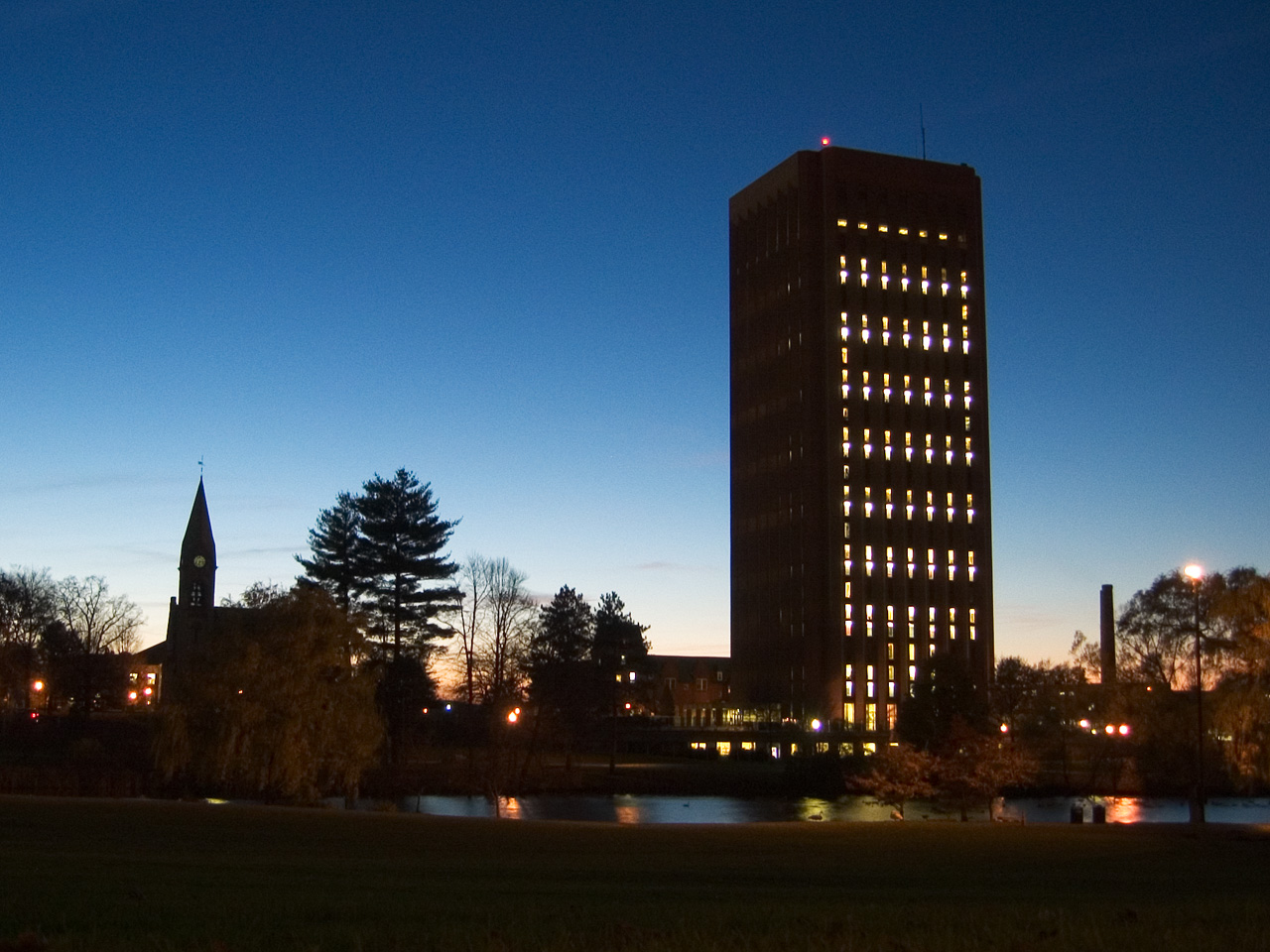
UMass Amherst campus at night, 18 miles north of Springfield

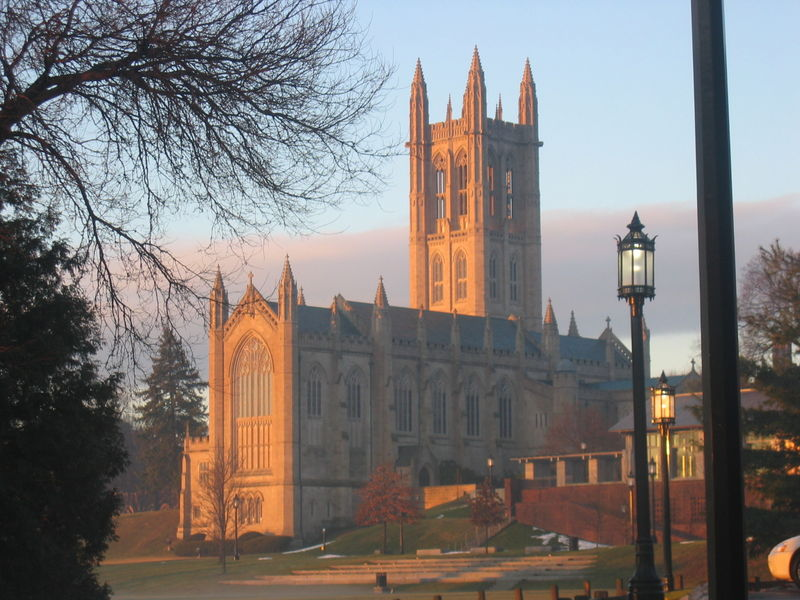
Trinity College Chapel, Hartford

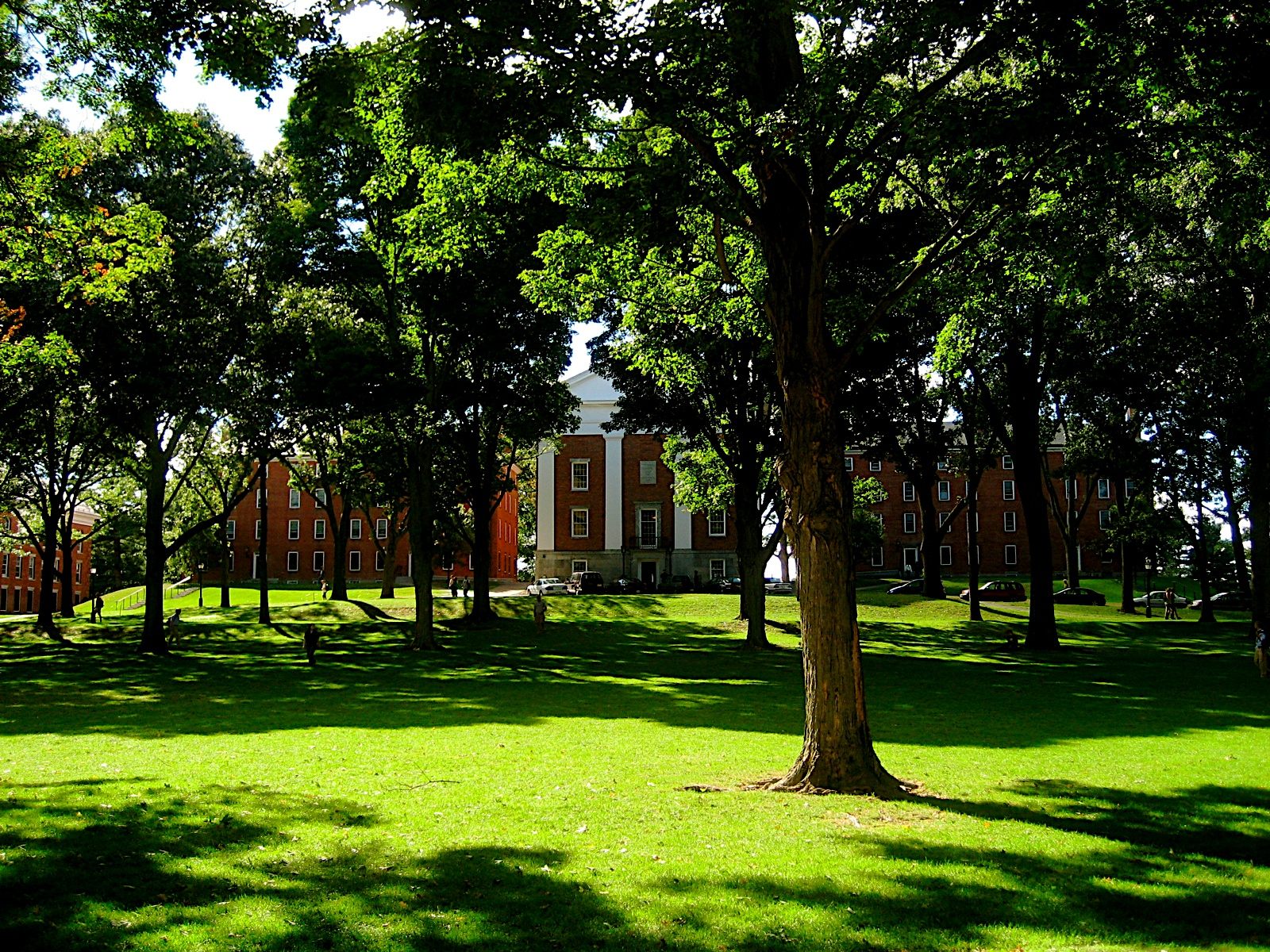
Amherst College's Main Quad, 17 miles north of Springfield

=== Public colleges and universities ===
- University of Connecticut
- University of Massachusetts Amherst
- Eastern Connecticut State University
- Central Connecticut State University
- Charter Oak State College
- Westfield State University

=== Community and technical colleges ===
- Asnuntuck Community College
- Capital Community College
- Greenfield Community College
- Holyoke Community College
- Manchester Community College
- Middlesex Community College
- Springfield Technical Community College
- Tunxis Community College

=== Private colleges and universities ===
- American International College – Springfield, MA
- Amherst College – Amherst MA
- Bay Path University – Longmeadow, MA
- Cambridge College – Springfield, MA
- Elms College – Chicopee, MA
- Goodwin College – Hartford, CT
- Hampshire College – Amherst, MA
- Hartford Seminary – Hartford, CT
- Mount Holyoke College – South Hadley, MA
- Smith College – Northampton, MA
- Springfield College – Springfield, MA
- Western New England University – Springfield, MA
- Rensselaer at Hartford – Hartford, CT
- Saint Joseph College – West Hartford, CT
- Trinity College – Hartford, CT
- University of Hartford – Hartford, CT
- Wesleyan University – Middletown, CT

== Lower education institutions ==
Public schools are highly regarded, in 2016 Massachusetts ranked first in the country for Pre-K through 12 education while Connecticut ranked fifth.

The Hartford–Springfield area is home to a high concentration of preparatory schools.

=== Private day and boarding schools ===
- Avon Old Farms – Avon, CT
- The Bement School – Deerfield, MA
- Cheshire Academy – Cheshire, CT
- Choate Rosemary Hall – Wallingford, CT
- Deerfield Academy – Deerfield, MA
- Eaglebrook School – Deerfield, MA
- The Ethel Walker School – Simsbury, CT
- Kingswood-Oxford School – West Hartford, CT
- Loomis Chaffee School – Windsor, CT
- MacDuffie School – Granby, MA
- Miss Porter's School – Farmington, CT
- Stoneleigh-Burnham School – Greenfield, MA
- Suffield Academy – Suffield, CT
- Watkinson School – Hartford, CT
- Wilbraham & Monson Academy – Wilbraham, MA
- Westminster School (Connecticut) – Simsbury, CT
- Williston Northampton School – Easthampton, MA

== See also ==
- Greater Hartford
- Springfield metropolitan area, Massachusetts
- Bradley International Airport
