= Connecticut State Community College =

College resulting from a 2023 merger of 12 colleges

- Seal of Connecticut State Community College
- Type: Public community college
- Established: July 1, 2023; 3 years ago
- Parent institution: Connecticut State Colleges & Universities
- Accreditation: NECHE
- President: Christina Royal (interim)
- Provost: Karen Hynick (acting)
- Students: 36,315 (fall 2024)
- Location: 185 Main Street, New Britain, Connecticut, US
- Campus: 12 main campuses and 5 satellite campuses
- Nickname: CT State
- Website: ctstate.edu

Connecticut State Community College (CT State or CSCC) is a public community college in the U.S. state of Connecticut, headquartered in New Britain. It was formed on July 1, 2023, by merging the state's twelve previously separate community colleges into a single institution accredited by the New England Commission of Higher Education (NECHE). It operates twelve main campuses and five satellite campuses and is part of the Connecticut State Colleges & Universities (CSCU) system.

The merger was proposed in 2017 as the "Students First" plan, intended to cut administrative costs as enrollment and state funding declined. The regional accreditor rejected the original proposal in 2018, and faculty unions opposed the plan. A revised version with a later timeline took effect in 2023. The college reported multimillion-dollar budget deficits in its first two fiscal years.

== History ==
=== Merger plan ===
In 2011, Connecticut placed its twelve community colleges, four regional state universities and Charter Oak State College under a single Board of Regents for Higher Education, creating the Connecticut State Colleges & Universities (CSCU) system. In April 2017, the board voted to pursue "Students First", a plan by CSCU president Mark Ojakian to merge the twelve separately accredited community colleges into one college and consolidate administrative functions. The plan followed years of discussion by the board about restructuring the system to avoid insolvency amid declining enrollment and shrinking state support. System officials projected savings of about $28 million a year. Ojakian said the savings would be reinvested in student services such as advisers and career counselors, and that a single college would be easier for students to navigate. He also warned that without consolidation, community college tuition could double within five years.

In April 2018, the regional accreditor, the New England Association of Schools and Colleges (now NECHE), rejected the plan, calling it unrealistic and warning that it risked disorder for students. Ojakian submitted a revised plan in June 2018 that pushed the merger date to 2023.

All five unions representing CSCU faculty and staff issued a joint statement opposing the consolidation. In 2019, a petition against the merger gathered 1,400 signatures, and faculty governance bodies passed votes of no confidence in Ojakian, the Board of Regents and the plan. Governance bodies at eleven of the twelve colleges passed resolutions declining to take part in the consolidation process.

=== Launch ===
The Board of Regents appointed John Maduko as the college's first president in 2022. In June 2023, NECHE granted the merged college initial accreditation as a single institution, effective July 1, 2023. The college opened on that date, and the twelve former colleges became its campuses. CT State describes itself as the largest community college in New England.

== Campuses ==
Connecticut State Community College is headquartered at 185 Main Street in New Britain, Connecticut. The college has twelve main campuses and five satellite campuses.

Location of Connecticut State Community College campuses. Black dots represent main campuses. Red dots represent satellite campuses.

| Campus | Former name | Location | Satellite campus |
|---|---|---|---|
| Asnuntuck | Asnuntuck Community College | Enfield | |
| Capital | Capital Community College | Hartford | |
| Gateway | Gateway Community College | New Haven | North Haven |
| Housatonic | Housatonic Community College | Bridgeport | |
| Manchester | Manchester Community College | Manchester | |
| Middlesex | Middlesex Community College | Middletown | Meriden |
| Naugatuck Valley | Naugatuck Valley Community College | Waterbury | Danbury |
| Northwestern | Northwestern Connecticut Community College | Winsted | |
| Norwalk | Norwalk Community College | Norwalk | |
| Quinebaug Valley | Quinebaug Valley Community College | Danielson | Willimantic |
| Three Rivers | Three Rivers Community College | Norwich | |
| Tunxis | Tunxis Community College | Farmington | Bristol |

== Organization and administration ==
CT State is one of six institutions in the CSCU system, along with Central, Eastern, Southern and Western Connecticut State Universities and Charter Oak State College. The system is governed by the Board of Regents for Higher Education, which sets tuition and appoints institution presidents; accreditation is granted separately by NECHE.

In July 2025, founding president John Maduko began a one-year term as interim chancellor of CSCU and was expected to return to CT State afterward. Christina Royal, a former president of Holyoke Community College, became interim president on August 1, 2025. Her appointment was later extended through June 30, 2027. In April 2026, Maduko resigned as interim chancellor a day after being placed on administrative leave over a complaint that he had violated a policy. Karen Hynick is the acting provost and vice president of academic affairs, student affairs and workforce innovation.

In 2025, the college replaced its twelve campus chief executive positions with seven campus presidents, several of whom oversee more than one campus.

== Academics ==
CT State offers more than 300 degree and certificate programs.

Connecticut's free-tuition program for community college students, the Pledge to Advance Connecticut (PACT), began in fall 2020 and was later renamed the Mary Ann Handley Award. By October 2025 it had awarded more than $91 million to over 33,500 students.

== Finances ==
In November 2023, Maduko told the Board of Regents that the college faced a combined deficit of $124.9 million over fiscal years 2024 and 2025. A mitigation plan closed the $33.6 million gap for fiscal year 2024 and reduced the projected gap for fiscal year 2025 from $91.3 million to $21.3 million. The shortfalls were attributed to the end of federal pandemic relief funding, rising labor costs and declining enrollment.

The Board of Regents froze tuition for the 2025–26 academic year, and in October 2025 voted to freeze it again for the following year.

=== Enrollment and student body ===
CT State enrolled 34,991 credit students in fall 2023 and 36,315 in fall 2024. CSCU reported a 4.3% enrollment increase at the college for fall 2025.

In spring 2024, 31% of students identified as Latino, 66% were first-generation college students, 70% attended part-time and 60% were women.
