= Alpha Beta Gamma =

International business honor society

- ΑΒΓ
- Founded: 1970; 56 years ago Manchester, Connecticut, US
- Type: Honor
- Affiliation: ACHS
- Status: Active
- Emphasis: Business; 2-year schools
- Scope: North America
- Member badge
- Colors: Black and Red
- Publication: The Honors Journal
- Chapters: 181
- Members: 80,000+ active
- Headquarters: 75 Grasslands Rd. Valhalla, New York 10595; United States
- Website: www.abg.org

Alpha Beta Gamma (ΑΒΓ) is an international business honor society established in 1970 in Manchester, Connecticut. It recognizes scholarship among students in business curricula at two-year community and technical colleges.

== History ==
Alpha Beta Gamma was established in 1970 in Manchester, Connecticut, as an international business honor society to recognize and encourage scholarship of students in business curricula at two-year community and technical colleges. Its founders were college and university professors, administrators, and representatives of existing honor societies.

Its purpose to is recognize the academic achievement of business students amongst two-year college students and to support career opportunities, intellectual development, scholarship, leadership, and networking for these business students.

By 2011, it had chartered 179 chapters and had initiated 69,940 members. Alpha Beta Gamma joined the Association of College Honor Societies in 1996. In 1998, the society amended its constitution to allow chapters in Canada and Mexico.

Alpha Beta Gamma's national headquarters is at 75 Grasslands Road in Valhalla, New York. As of 2024, it has initiated more than 80,000 members.

== Symbols ==
Alpha Beta Gamma's colors are black and red. It has regalia for members and faculty. Its advisor's stole is red satin and had the society's emblem, Greek letters, and gold tassels. Its member's honor stole is sapphire blue with the society's emblem and Greek letters. Members may also wear a silver honor cord. Members also received a gold-tone lapel pin. Its publication is The Honors Journal.

== Activities ==
Alpha Beta Gamma holds an annual leadership convention that includes elections, lectures, and seminars. The society offers annual scholarships for its members and presents annual chapter awards. It also has an annual essay competition for student members. Its 2025 national service project is helping the Red Cross with blood drives, with each chapter hosting a campus blood drive. In addition, some chapters conduct community service projects.

== Membership ==
To be eligible for membership in Alpha Beta Gamma, a student must be enrolled in a business curriculum in a junior, community, or technical college, or a two-year accredited program within a college or university. The student must rank in the top 35 percent of their class and have a 3.0 GPA in business courses and overall. The student must have completed fifteen credit hours with at least twelve hours of taken in courses leading to a degree.

Some of the recognized degrees include accounting, actuarial science, administration, advertising, agricultural and agroecology business, agricultural engineering technology, architecture and design construction technology, arts management, automotive technologies, aviation management, banking, biological science, biotechnology, broadcasting, business administration, casino management, civil construction technology, communications, computer information systems, conservation and regulations, construction management, cosmetology, criminal justice, culinary arts and management, cyber crime technology, dairy management, dental hygiene, digital filmmaking and video production, digital photography, drug and alcohol counseling, early childhood education, economics, elementary education, emerging technologies, energy management, entrepreneurship, exercise science, fashion design, fashion marking and management, finance, fire science technology, food service, game art and design, graphic design, health insurance claims management, health service administration, homeland security and emergency management, horticulture technology, hotel and hospitality management, human resource management, industrial design, industrial management and relations, information systems, interior design, international business, international studies, investments and securities, landscape and ornamental horticulture, legal professions, library science, management information systems, management science marketing research and management, media arts and animation, medical assisting and laboratory tech, medical coding and billing, mortuary science, motor vehicle technology, nuclear medicine, nursing, occupational health and safety, office technologies, operations research, physical therapy assistant, postal services management, public administration, public relations, range management, recreational management, restaurant management, secretarial science, small business management, sport management, supply chain management, surveying an geomatics engineering technology, systems analyst, taxation, textile engineering, theatre management, trade management, transportation management, travel and tourism, veterinary technology, visual and game programming, visual effects and motion graphics, visual and game programming, web design and interactive media, welding, and wildlife management.

== Chapters ==
Following are some of the 181 chapters of Alpha Beta Gamma, with active chapters in bold and inactive chapters and institutions in italics.

Chapter	Charter date and range	Institution	Location	Status	Ref.
**Alpha**	1970	Manchester Community College	Manchester, Connecticut	Active	
Beta	197x ?	Lincoln Land Community College	Springfield, Illinois	Inactive	
**Gamma**	197x ?	Vincennes University	Vincennes, Indiana	Active	
**Delta**	1970	Westchester Community College	Valhalla, New York	Active	
Eta	197x ?	Germanna Community College	Orange, Virginia	Inactive	
**Kappa**	197x ?	Housatonic Community College Connecticut State Community College Housatonic	Bridgeport, Connecticut	Active	(Note: Chapter formed at Housatonic Community College, which became Connecticut State Community College Housatonic in 2023.)
**Lambda**	October 1976	Hinds Community College	Raymond, Mississippi	Active	(Note: Chapter formed at Hinds Junior College, now called Hinds Community College.)
**Mu**	197x ?	Suffolk County Community College, Michael J. Grant Campus	Brentwood, New York	Active	
**Nu**	May 1971	Finger Lakes Community College	Canandaigua, New York	Active	
**Xi**		Queensborough Community College	Bayside, Queens, New York City, New York	Active	
Sigma	197x ?	Abraham Baldwin Agricultural College	Tifton, Georgia	Inactive	
Tau	19xx ?–1992	Mattatuck Community College	Waterbury, Connecticut	Moved	(Note: Mattatuck Community College merged with Waterbury State Technical College in 1992, forming Naugatuck Valley Community College.)
**Upsilon**		Manor College	Abington Township, Pennsylvania	Inactive	(Note: Chapter formed at Manor Junior College, now called Manor College.)
**Chi**		Suffolk County Community College, Ammerman Campus	Seldon, New York	Active	
Omega	19xx ?–2008	Brooks College	Long Beach, California	Inactive	(Note: The college closed in 2008.)
**Alpha Omicron**		Connecticut State Community College Quinebaug Valley	Danielson, Connecticut	Active	
Alpha Tau		Diablo Valley College, San Ramon Campus	San Ramon, California		
Alpha Phi		Coastline College	Orange County, California	Inactive	
**Alpha Psi**	1992	Del Mar College	Corpus Christi, Texas	Active	
Alpha Omega	2008	Southwestern Community College	Sylva, North Carolina	Active	
**Beta Alpha**		Suffolk County Community College, Eastern Campus	Northampton, New York	Active	
Beta Beta	1982	Vincennes University, Jasper Center	Jasper, Indiana	Inactive	
**Beta Omicron**		Northern Essex Community College	Haverhill and Lawrence, Massachusetts	Active	
**Beta Sigma**		College of the Canyons	Santa Clarita, California	Active	
Beta Tau	April 1998 – 20xx ?	Mississippi Gulf Coast Community College, Jackson County Campus	Gautier, Mississippi	Inactive	
Beta Tau		Chowan College	Murfreesboro, North Carolina	Inactive	
Beta Upsilon		Kirkwood Community College	Cedar Rapids, Iowa	Inactive	
**Gamma Phi**		Rowan College of South Jersey	Sewell, New Jersey	Active	
**Delta Zeta**		Dutchess Community College	Poughkeepsie, New York	Active	
**Delta Lambda**	2000	Carroll Community College	Westminster, Maryland	Active	
**Delta Omicron**		Raritan Valley Community College	Branchburg, New Jersey	Active	
**Delta Tau**	1993	Black Hawk College	Moline, Illinois	Active	
Delta Phi	March 2010 – 2018	Art Institute of California Orange County	Santa Ana, California	Inactive	(Note: The Art Institute branch in Orange County closed in December 2018.)
**Zeta Beta**	2008	City College of San Francisco	San Francisco, California	Active	
**Eta Delta**		Delaware Technical Community College	Dover, Georgetown, Stanton, and Wilmington, Delaware	Active	
**Eta Mu**		Bunker Hill Community College	Boston, Massachusetts	Active	
Eta Sigma		Community College of Philadelphia	Philadelphia, Pennsylvania		
**Eta Chi**		Lee College	Baytown, Texas	Active	
**Theta Zeta**		Orange Coast College	Costa Mesa, California	Active	
**Iota Zeta**		Danville Community College	Danville, Virginia	Active	
**Iota Lambda**		Santa Ana College	Santa Ana, California	Active	
**Iota Upsilon**	2003	Cumberland County College	Vineland, New Jersey	Active	
**Kappa Rho**		Bryant & Stratton College	Orchard Park, New York	Active	
**Kappa Upsilon**		North Central Missouri College	Trenton, Missouri	Active	
**Chi Gamma**		Mount Wachusett Community College	Gardner, Massachusetts	Active	
**Chi Zeta**	2024	Athens Technical College	Athens, Georgia	Active	
**Chi Mu**	19xx ?	Three Rivers College	Poplar Bluff, Missouri	Active	
	1971 ?	Berkshire Community College	Pittsfield, Massachusetts	Inactive	
		Bronx Community College	Bronx, New York City, New York	Active	
		College of San Mateo	San Mateo, California	Active	
		Connecticut State Community College Naugatuck Valley	Waterbury, Connecticut	Active	
		Dallas College North Lake Campus station	Irving, Texas	Active	
		Georgia State University Dunwoody Campus	Dunwoody, Georgia	Active	
		Hopkinsville Community College	Hopkinsville, Kentucky		
	2024	Horry-Georgetown Technical College	Conway, South Carolina	Active	
		Howard Community College	Columbia, Maryland	Active	
	2021	Massasoit Community College	Brockton, Massachusetts	Active	
		Montgomery College	Montgomery County, Maryland	Active	
		Napa Valley College	Napa, California	Active	
	1992 ?	Connecticut State Community College Naugatuck Valley	Waterbury, Connecticut	Active	(Note: Chapter formed at Naugatuck Valley Community College, which became Connecticut State Community College Naugatuck Valley in 2023.)
		Ocean County College	Ocean County, New Jersey	Active	
		Orange Coast College	Costa Mesa, California	Active	
		Post College	Waterbury, Connecticut	Inactive	
		Tri-County Community College	Murphy, North Carolina	Active	
	197x ?–1977	Wingate College	Wingate, North Carolina	Inactive	(Note: Wingate became a four-year college in 1977.)

== Notable members ==
- Mallika Srinivasan, chairman and managing director of Tractors and Farm Equipment Limited

== See also ==
- Honor cords
- Honor society
- Professional fraternities and sororities
