= Daniel Robbins (entrepreneur) =

21st-century American media entrepreneur

- Born: United States
- Education: Charter Oak State College
- Occupations: Marketing and media entrepreneur; author; speaker
- Years active: 2000s–present
- Known for: Founder and CEO of IBH Media
- Notable work: Unlimited Possibilities (with Kate Hancock)
- Spouse: Kate Hancock
- Children: 2
- Website: ibhmedia.com

Daniel Robbins is an American marketing and media entrepreneur, author, and speaker whose work includes media agency operations and entrepreneurial community building. He is the creator of Founder's Story, a weekly podcast.

== Biography ==
Robbins claims that from adolescence he had an interest in technology, coding, and digital media. He held associations with education at institutions including an associate qualification from Valencia College and a bachelor's in organizational leadership at Charter Oak State College. (Note: Although Hancock, his wife, states that Robbins "dropped out of college".)

Robbins is the founder and chief executive officer of IBH Media, a media production, branding and public-relations company which engages in digital content creation, podcasting, and television segment production. The company's services include executive visibility, book and brand management, and media placements for clients.

As an author, Robbins has published books and articles on entrepreneurship, media strategy, and new-media business. Together with his Filipino American wife, Kate Hancock, he is the co-author of Unlimited Possibilities, a joint autobiography and self-help book, published in 2025. He has also contributed to articles and platforms discussing founder mindset, digital transformation, and emergent technology business models.

Robbins and his wife maintain an active presence on social media and business-media platforms where they promotes conversations around media strategy, brand visibility, web3, and metaverse potential, including shifting media paradigms in technology-driven economies.

Robbins' wife, Kate Hancock, was born on Camiguin Island and is an hospitality and cosmetics entrepreneur who was named as one of the "100 Most Influential Filipina in the World", "The Young Entrepreneur to Watch in 2017", and was nominated by the Orange County Business Journal as Woman of the Year. She founded the Global AI Council, and Robbins is a member of the council's advisory board and media director. They have two children.
