= Constance Green =

Constance Green may refer to:

- Constance McLaughlin Green (1897–1975), American historian
- Constance Belton Green, American lawyer

== See also ==
- Constance Greene (1861–1919), natural historian
