= Connecticut State Community College Housatonic =

Community college in Bridgeport, Connecticut, U.S.

Coordinates: 41.1756°N 73.1915°W

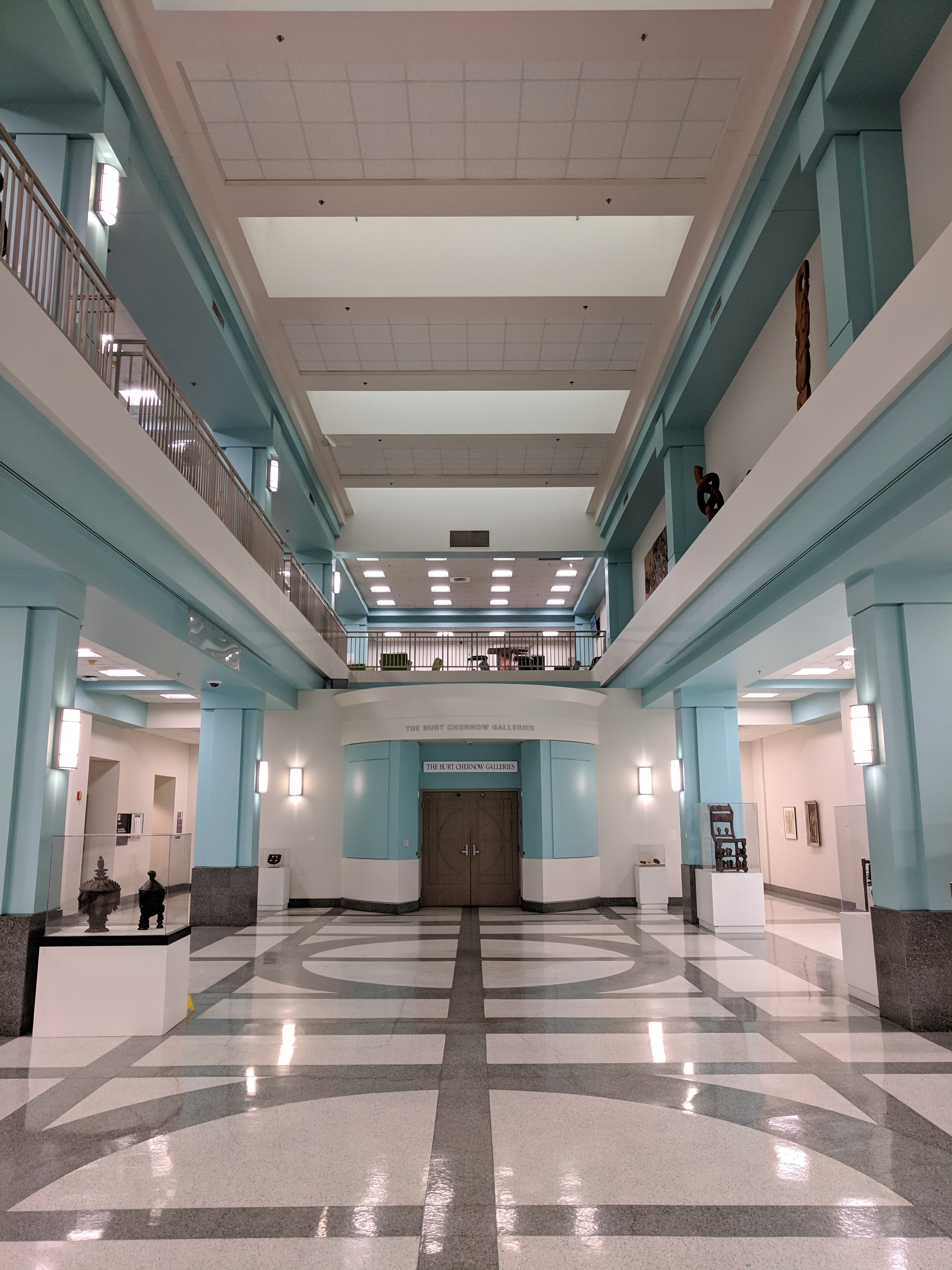
- Lafayette Hall atrium at CT State Community College Housatonic
- Former names: Housatonic Community College (1967–1993) Housatonic Community-Technical College (1993–1999) Housatonic Community College (1993–2023)
- Type: Public community college
- Established: October 1967
- Parent institution: Connecticut State Community College
- Accreditation: New England Commission of Higher Education
- President: Kamari A. Collins
- Students: 3,821 (2021)
- Location: 900 Lafayette Boulevard, Bridgeport, Connecticut, 06604, United States
- Colors: █ Blue █ White
- Mascot: Hawk
- Website: ctstate.edu/locations/housatonic

Connecticut State Community College Housatonic, formerly Housatonic Community College, is a public community college campus in Bridgeport, Connecticut, United States. Established in 1997, it became Connecticut State Community College Housatonic in 2023 as part of a merger of twelve institutions that established Connecticut State Community College. It is now a campus of that larger institution.

== History ==
Connecticut State Community College Housatonic started in Stratford, Connecticut as a branch of Norwalk Community College in 1966 It had 378 students in its first semester and held classes at public schools, a church, the public library, and the Masonic Temple. It became an independent campus of the Connecticut Community College system called Housatonic Community College, in October 1967. Edward Liston was the college's first president.

The college moved to Bridgeport, Connecticut in January 1971, where it was housed in the Singer Metric Building for nearly thirty years. In 1993, it changed its name to Housatonic Community-Technical College and purchased the former Hi-Ho Mall at 900 Lafayette Boulevard for a new campus. The college moved to its new location at the former mall on January 27, 1997, with some 2,700 students. In October 1999, its name was changed to Housatonic Community College.

In 2006, the college purchased the former Sears building located south of the campus; renamed Beacon Hall, it opened in 2008. Enrollment reached 6,000 students in the spring of 2011. In 2023, Housatonic Community College merged with twelve other institutions to established the Connecticut State Community College. Now called the Connecticut State Community College Housatonic, it is campus of the larger institution.

== Campus ==
The college is located at 900 Lafayette Boulevard in Bridgeport, Connecticut. The first building on campus was Lafayette Hall, which currently houses admistrative and business offices, classrooms, the campus library, and the Burt Chernow Galleries. Campus also includes Beacon Hall, a 174,000 square feet structure that includes the campus bookstore, a computer lab, and classrooms.

== Academics ==
=== Programs ===
The college offered associate degrees and certificates in 40 fields in 2021. This included business, criminal justice/police science, and general students.

=== Accreditation ===
Connecticut State Community College and its campuses are accredited by the New England Commission of Higher Education.

=== Faculty ===
In 2021, the college's student-to-faculty ratio was fifteen to one. The campus president is Kamari Collins.

=== Students ===
In 2021, the college had 3,821 students, including 1,334 full-time and 2,487 part-time students. This included 65 percent females and 35 percent males, broken down as 36 percent Hispanic/Latino, 30 percent Black, 26 percent White, 3 percent Asian, 3 percent two or more races, and 2 percent unknown.

=== Museum ===
The Housatonic Museum of Art is located on campus, with works displayed throughout the college and in the Burt Chernow Galleries. The musem was established in 1967 by Burt Chernow, an art historian, professor, and chairman of the college's art department.

== Student life ==
The college has chapters of the Phi Theta Kappa, Alpha Beta Gamma, Psi Beta, and Epsilon Pi Tau honor societies.
