= Connecticut State Community College Gateway =

Community college in New Haven, Connecticut, US

Coordinates: 41.2872°N 72.9274°W

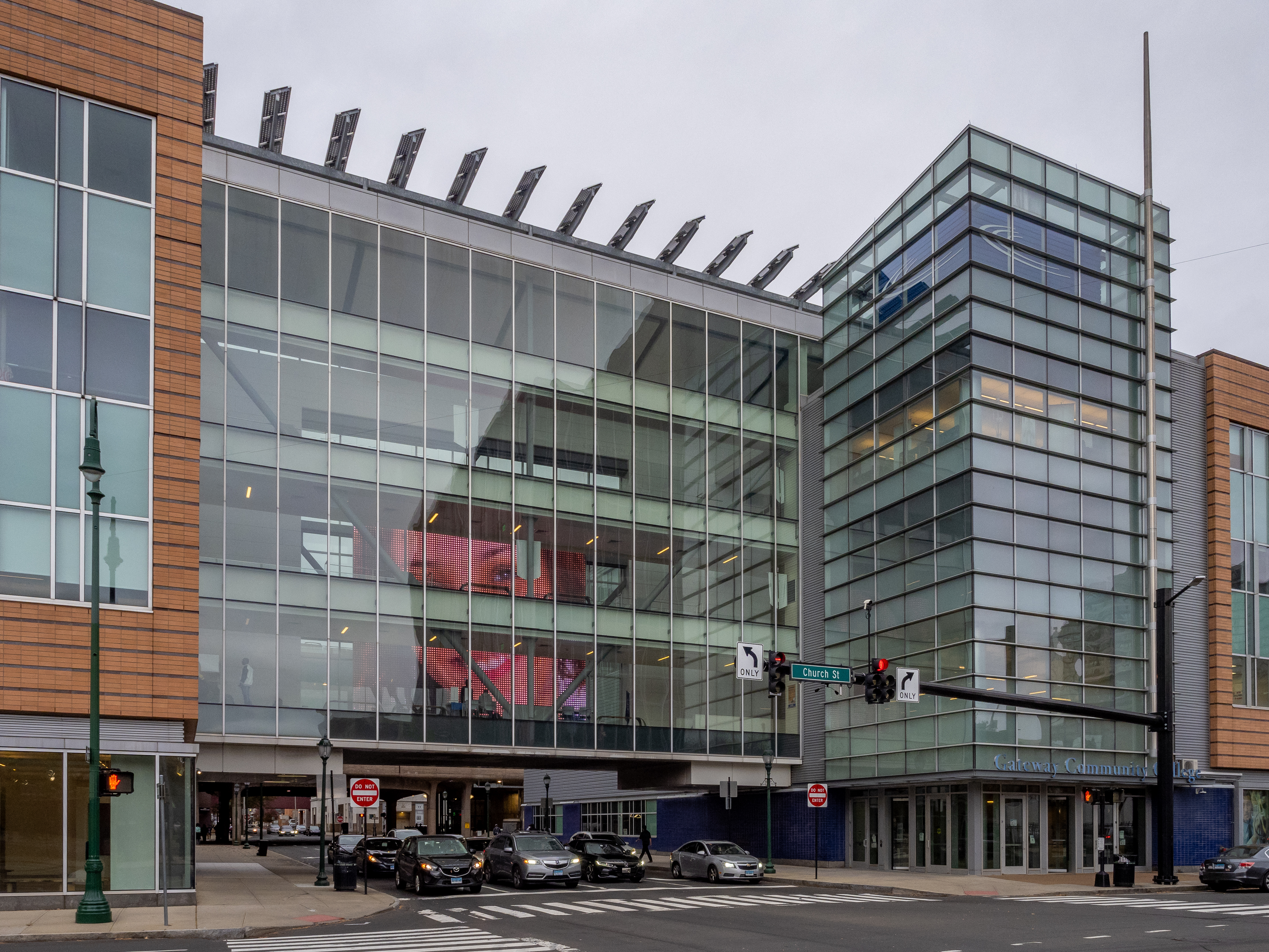
- Former name: Gateway Community College (1992–2023)
- Type: Public Community College
- Established: July 1, 1992
- Parent institution: Connecticut State Community College
- Accreditation: New England Commission of Higher Education
- President: Shiang-Kwei Wang
- Students: 14,000+
- Location: 20 Church Street, New Haven, Connecticut, United States
- Campus: Urban
- Colors: █ Navy █ Gold
- Mascot: Lions
- Website: www.gatewayct.edu

Connecticut State Community College Gateway, formerly Gateway Community College, is a public community college campus in New Haven, Connecticut. It has a satellite campus in North Haven, Connecticut. Gateway Community College was established in 1992 with the merger of two institutions. It gained its current name in 2023 with the merger of twelve institutions to form Connecticut State Community College. Gateway is now a campus of that larger institution.

== History ==
Gateway Community College was formed on July 1, 1992, from the consolidation South Central Community College in New Haven, Connecticut and Greater New Haven State Technical College in North Haven, Connecticut. It became the Connecticut State Community College Gateway with the 2023 merger of twelve institutions formed the Connecticut State Community College. It is a campus of that parent institution which is accredited by the New England Commission of Higher Education.

== Campus ==
Connecticut State Community College Gateway's main campus is located at 20 Church Street in New Haven, Connecticut. It has a satellite campus at 88 Bassett Road in North Haven, Connecticut.

== Academics ==
=== Programs ===
Connecticut State Community College Gateway has more than ninety academic programs and offers associate degrees and certificates in 54 fields. It also provides classes for professional development.

=== Faculty ===
In 2023, the college's student to faculty ratio was fifteen to one. The campus president is Shiang-Kwei Wang.

=== Students ===
As of 2026, the college has more than 14,000 students. In 2023, its main campus enrollment was 6,003, with 1,902 full-time and 4,101 part-time students. Of those students 63 percent were female and 37 percent were male, including 37 percent White, 28 percent Hispanic/Latino, 24 percent Black, 4 percent Asian, 3 percent two or more races, and 3 percent unknown.
