= Connecticut State Community College Three Rivers =

Public community college in Norwich, CT

Coordinates: 41.5106°N 72.1028°W

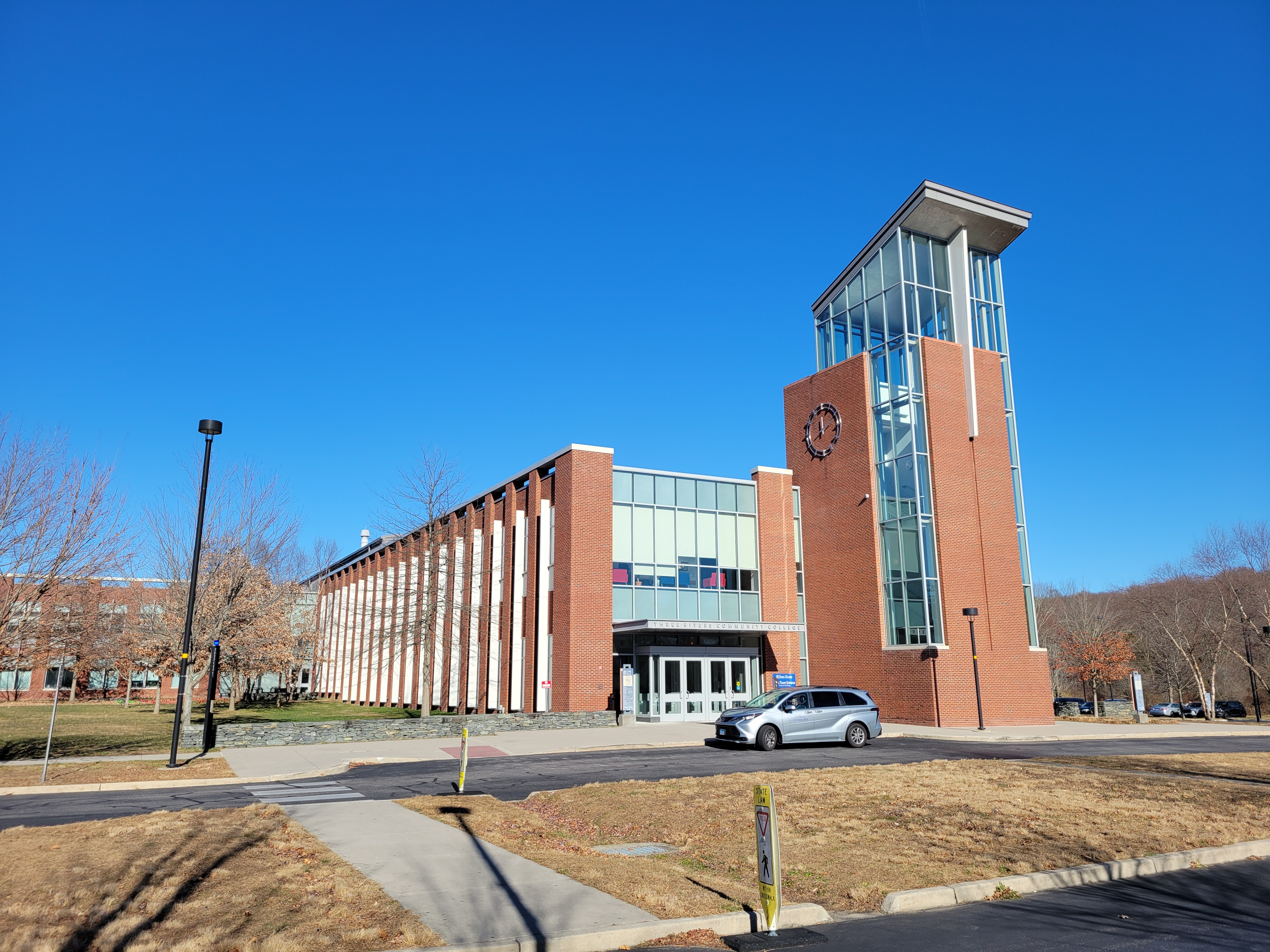
- Three Rivers Community College Clock Tower
- Former name: Three Rivers Community College (1992-2023)
- Type: Public community college
- Established: 1992
- Parent institution: Connecticut State Community College
- President: Mary Jukoski
- Total staff: 301
- Students: 2,937
- Location: Norwich, Connecticut, United States
- Campus: 22.7 acres (9.2 ha); Suburban
- Website: ctstate.edu/locations/three-rivers

Connecticut State Community College Three Rivers, formerly Three Rivers Community College, is a public community college in Norwich, Connecticut, United States. In 2023, it was consolidated into Connecticut State Community College, a single accredited institution formed through the merger of Connecticut's twelve community colleges. As part of this restructuring, Three Rivers became the Connecticut State Community College Three Rivers campus.

== History ==
In 1992, Mohegan Community College and Thames Valley State Technical College merged to form Three Rivers Community College, named after the three major rivers in the region: the Shetucket, the Yantic and the Thames. 2023 was the last commencement under the name Three Rivers Community College. On July 1, 2023, it, along with the other 11 community colleges, merged into a single state institution. It is now the Three Rivers campus of Connecticut State Community College. It is accredited by the New England Commission of Higher Education.

Mohegan Community College was formed in 1970 by founding president Robert N. Rue and President Emeritus of Three Rivers Community College. Mohegan opened to students in September of 1970 and the inaugural address was given by Gorton Riethmiller, president emeritus of Olivet College where Rue's administrative career had begun. There were initially two campuses of Mohegan, one in Norwich and one in New London. The first commencement for Mohegan took place in May of 1972. Mohegan developed a strong nursing program, which began in 1971; it was awarded funds by the Connecticut State Health, Education and Welfare Department for scholarships and loans to students in 1977. A permanent new home for Mohegan on Mahan Drive in Norwich was also announced in May of 1972, when the State Bond Commission issued more than $3 million to purchase what was then the Notre Dame Girls High School.

== Campus ==
Three Rivers was originally two separate community colleges of Mohegan and Thames Valley, which were on opposite sides of Norwich. In 2003, the state legislature approved funding to consolidate the college at the Thames Valley campus. In 2009, the college finally consolidated into the one campus at 574 New London Turnpke in Norwich. There are also two off-campus instructional centers, one at the nearby Naval Submarine Base, the other at Ella Grasso Technical School in Groton.

== Academics ==
Three Rivers Community College offers associate degrees and certificates. It offers an honors program for students who meet the prerequisites.

Three Rivers Community College is also the home of Three Rivers Middle College (TRMC), a dual-enrollment magnet high school. TRMC students combine the last two years of high school with up to one full year of college courses, giving them a head start on their associate degrees.

The campus president is Mary Jukoski.
