= Danville Community College =

College in Danville, Virginia, U.S.

Coordinates: 36°33′56″N 79°24′28.8″W

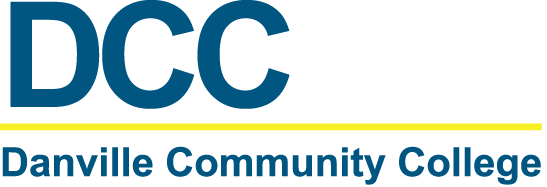
- Former name: Danville Textile School
- Type: Public community college
- Established: 1936
- Parent institution: Virginia Community College System
- Location: Danville, Virginia, United States
- Campus: 86-acre
- Nickname: Knights
- Website: Official website

Danville Community College (DCC) is a public community college in Danville, Virginia. It is part of the Virginia Community College System (VCCS). Unlike many of the other VCCS schools, it predates the formation of a statewide body for junior colleges. Its roots began in 1936 as Danville Textile School.. In addition, a branch campus of Virginia Tech located in Danville was folded into the college in 1968 Danville Community College also has a baseball team, which won the Virginia Community College System state baseball championships in 2006 and 2007.

The college has an 86-acre (350,000 m^{2}) campus serving the City of Danville, Pittsylvania County and Halifax County. The main campus is located on South Main Street in Danville, consisting of 11 college buildings.

Beginning as early as 1890, the campus of Danville Military Institute (1890 to 1939) housed prisoners of war during World War II (1944–1945), was home to the off-campus engineering division of Virginia Polytechnic Institute (named VPI Extension - fall 1946 to 1950, Danville Branch of VPI - 1950 to 1965, and Danville Division of VPI - 1965 to 1968), and shared the campus with Danville Technical Institute (formerly Danville Textile School) from 1945 to 1966, until DTI merged with the Danville Division of VPI to form Danville Community College.

Danville Community College is governed by an advisory board of nine members. The college is supervised by the VCCS and State Board for Community Colleges. It is accredited by the Southern Association of Colleges and Schools to award associate degrees.

== Extra-curricular offerings ==
=== Athletics ===
- DCC Knights baseball (established 2001; they are 2002, 2006, and 2007 Virginia Community College champions) (Discontinued)
- DCC Knights men's and women's basketball (established 2004; cancelled)
- DCC Knights soccer (established 2008; cancelled)
- DCC Knights Women's volleyball (established 2015)

=== Clubs and organizations ===
- Afro-American Culture Club
- Alpha Beta Gamma - International Business Honor Society
- Better Earth & Animal Treatment Society (BEATS)
- College Entrepreneurs' Organization (CEO)
- Christian Student Fellowship
- DCC CyberKnights (Cyber Security/Networking)
- DCC Gospel Choir
- DCC Graphics Club
- DCC Knights Cheerleaders
- Honors Program
- International Association of Administrative Professionals (IAAP)
- American Criminal Justice Association- (Justice Club)
- National Technical Honors Society (NTHS)
- Phi Theta Kappa (PTK)
- Sigma Kappa Delta (International English Honor Society)
- Student Government Association (SGA)
