= WACC-LP =

Radio station in Enfield, Connecticut, United States

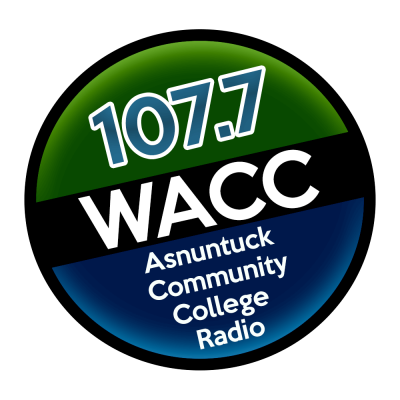
- Enfield, Connecticut; United States
- Frequency: 107.7 MHz
- Branding: "107-7 WACC"

Programming
- Format: Alternative rock

Ownership
- Owner: Asnuntuck Community College

History
- Call sign meaning: Asnuntuck Community College

Technical information
- Licensing authority: FCC
- Facility ID: 127007
- Class: L1
- ERP: 100 watts
- HAAT: 12.0 meters (39 feet)
- Transmitter coordinates: 41°58′24.00″N 72°35′5.00″W

Links
- Public license information: LMS
- Webcast: Listen live
- Website: Official Website

WACC-LP (107.7 FM) is a radio station broadcasting an alternative rock music format. The station breaks from its regular programming every night by featuring different formats. Licensed to Enfield, Connecticut, United States. WACC was one of the first LPFM stations in the state of Connecticut and operates 24 hours a day with a 100-watt ERP signal. The transmitter is located at the Enfield Fire Department. Despite its low power the signal can be heard as far north as Northampton, Massachusetts and as far south as Farmington, Connecticut. The station is currently owned by Asnuntuck Community College.

The long-time operations manager is WKCI-FM and WKSS's Adam Rivers.

== See also ==
- Campus radio
- List of college radio stations in the United States
