= Dallas K. Beal =

American University President

2nd President of the Connecticut State University System
- In office 1986 – May 1, 1994
- Governor: William A. O'Neill
- Preceded by: James A. Frost
- Succeeded by: William J. Cibes, Jr

10th President of the State University of New York at Fredonia
- In office 1971–1984
- Governor: Nelson Rockefeller
- Preceded by: Oscar E. Lanford
- Succeeded by: Donald MacPhee

Personal details
- Born: 1926
- Died: December 29, 2002 (aged 75–76) Fredonia, New York, U.S.
- Spouse: Elizabeth Beal, (m. 1951; died 2002)
- Children: 2
- Education: Ohio State University (BA, MA); Columbia University (PhD)

Military service
- Branch/service: United States Navy
- Battles/wars: World War II

Dallas K. Beal was an American educator and academic administrator best known for his leadership in the State University of New York system and the Connecticut State University System.

== Early life and education ==
Beal earned a Bachelor of Science in Elementary and Secondary Education from Ohio State University in 1950, and a master's degree in Elementary Education in 1951. He completed a Doctor of Education in Curriculum and Teaching at Columbia University in 1958.

== Career ==
Beal began his academic career at the State University of New York at Fredonia in 1958 as dean of Professional Studies. He later served as vice president for Academic Affairs, and was ultimately appointed president. During his presidency, he managed significant campus development, which included the construction of Steele Hall Fieldhouse and the expansion of women's athletics programs.

Following his tenure at Fredonia, Beal was appointed president of the Connecticut State University System, where he guided the system through institutional expansion and curriculum reform. Beal played a pivotal role in the expansion of music programs, as well as in visual and performing arts, which stands as one of his most significant contributions, according to James R. Roach, president of Western Connecticut State University in Danbury.

== Personal life ==
Beal had at least two children with his wife, Elizabeth W. Beal.

== Legacy ==
Beal and his wife were recognized by the Fredonia College Foundation with the Distinguished Service Award in 1986.

The Dallas K. and Elizabeth W. Beal Award continues to honor student leadership at SUNY Fredonia.

The Dallas K. Beal Community Access Fund provides local families with access to arts programming at Fredonia.

== See also ==
- List of Connecticut State University System executives
