= Al Terzi =

American news anchor

- Occupation: Television journalist
- Website: http://www.wfsb.com/newsteam/9313280/detail.html

Al Terzi is a politics and news anchor who works for WTIC-TV. Terzi has worked in Connecticut for all but two years since 1968. He is considered "the Dean of Connecticut news anchors."

== Career ==
Al began with WTIC-AM-FM-TV in June 1968 as a staff announcer. The station was owned by Travelers Insurance. When The Washington Post bought the television station in 1973 and renamed it WFSB, Terzi remained as newscaster and talk show host. He was the original host when New England Journal, a one-hour daily talk show, debuted in 1974.

Terzi continued as news co-anchor until he left in June 1978 and then became News Anchor, then News Director, at WPEC-TV12 (ABC) in West Palm Beach, FL. In October 1978, Terzi was seriously injured when the twin-engine Cessna he piloted, with 4 other WPEC senior staff on board, had engine/fuel problems on approach to the Tallahassee, FL airport. He was forced to make an emergency landing in a small clearing, in the Appalachicola National Forest, south of the airport. During the landing, Terzi was seriously injured and knocked unconscious, when his face slammed into the plane's instrument panel. The other occupants, who were also injured, exited the plane and moved away from it, in case a fire broke out. They had left Terzi inside the plane. One of the passengers said it was assumed that he was dead, because of his severe bleeding and the fact that he was not moving. He soon regained consciousness, exited the plane on his own and joined the passengers who were awaiting medical help. After several surgeries, over a period of several months, Terzi returned to the anchor desk in May 1979.

Terzi returned to Connecticut in April 1980 to work as prime anchor at WTNH in New Haven. He remained there until January 1994, when he returned to WFSB.

Terzi's colleague Janet Peckinpaugh alleged that he sexually harassed her when the two anchored at WTNH. Peckinpaugh was fired from WFSB in 1995. She sued the previous owners of WFSB (Post-Newsweek) and in court made allegations about Terzi. Peckinpaugh was awarded more than eight million dollars, but it was settled out of court.

Terzi has shared in two Emmy awards since rejoining Channel 3. The first was for a series of specials on the UConn Huskies basketball team, and the second, for "Best Newscast."

Terzi is a long-standing member of the Society of Professional Journalists.

Terzi left WFSB as their evening anchor February 24, 2012 after he and WFSB could not come to terms on a new contract.

On July 8, 2012, Fox affiliate WTIC-TV announced that Terzi will be joining the anchor team as the newest member.

Terzi anchored the 5 p.m. newscast with Alison Morris since it was launched in January 2013. up until his retirement from the anchor desk.

In March 2014 after an over 50-year career in broadcasting Terzi he would be scaling back on-air duties by retiring from the anchor desk. He said he plans will be to continue to host the political show, “The Real Story,” with Fox CT's Laurie Perez. referring to the Sunday morning show as well as continuing teaching at the Connecticut School of Broadcasting and exploring teaching jobs at some area colleges and universities as well.

Terzi said he began thinking about scaling back his career when he and his wife Carolyn began making plans for their 50th wedding anniversary.

== Education ==
Al Terzi earned a Bachelor of Arts degree in East Asian Languages (Chinese and Korean), from Charter Oak State College following studies at Yale University and Central Connecticut State University. Al also holds a law degree from the University of Connecticut School of Law in Hartford, CT.

== Military service ==
Al Terzi served over seven years of active duty with the U.S. Air Force intelligence operations, working in the Far East, and later, as an instructor at an air base in Texas.
