= Connecticut State Community College Tunxis =

Public college in Farmington, Connecticut, US

Coordinates: 41.7057°N 72.8781°W

- "The Point Where The River Bends"
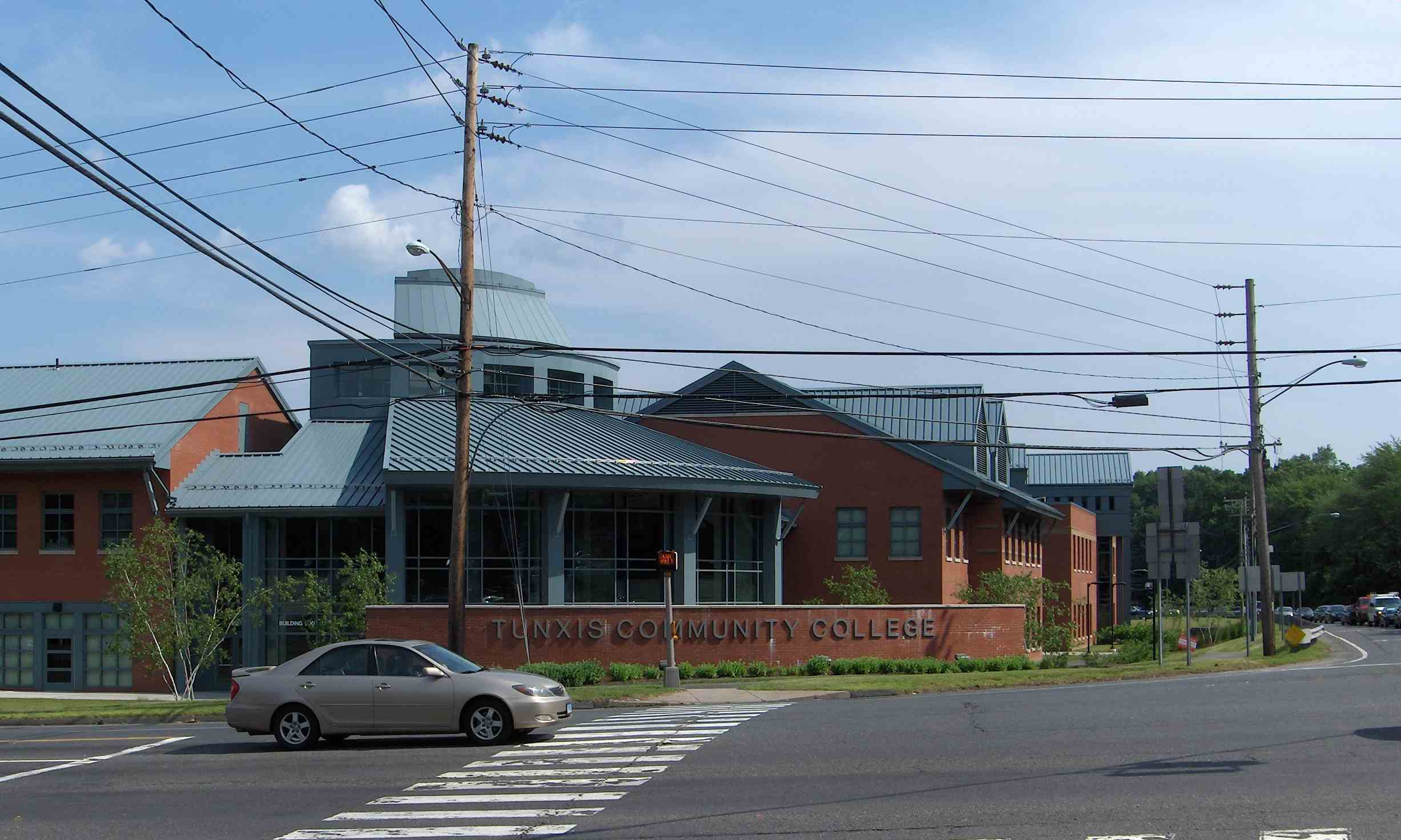
- Motto: Education that works for a lifetime
- Type: Public community college
- Established: 1969
- Parent institution: Connecticut State Community College
- Accreditation: New England Commission of Higher Education
- President: Sharale W. Mathis
- Students: 7000
- Location: 271 Scott Swamp Road, Farmington, Connecticut, United States
- Campus: Suburban
- Website: ctstate.edu/locations/tunxis

Connecticut State Community College Tunxis, formerly Tunxis Community College, is a public community college in Farmington, Connecticut. Opened in 1969, it is named after the Tunxis Native American Tribe. In 2023, it merged with twelve other colleges to form Connecticut State Community College and is now a campus of that institution. It has a satellite campus in Bristol, Connecticut.

== History ==
The campus was chartered in 1969 as the Tunxis Community College. It opened in October 1970 with 494 students. Its serves the Bristol-New Britain and Farmington Valley areas of Connecticut. It was named after the Tunxis Native American Tribe.

On July 1, 2023, it merged with twelve other community colleges to form Connecticut State Community College, becoming Connecticut State Community College Tunxis.

== Campus ==
The college's main campus is located at 271 Scott Swamp Road in Farmington, Connecticut. Originally operating in a former shopping mall, a large expansion to the campus was completed in 2008. The expansion included a new 37,074 square foot library building with a cafe, and a 57,800 square foot classroom technology building. In 2013, a further expansion to the classroom building was completed that added another 56,000 square feet of space for classrooms and labs.

Connecticut State Community College Tunxis has a satellite campus at 430 North Main Street in Bristol, Connecticut.

== Academics ==
=== Programs ===
Tunxis awards Associate degrees and also offers certificate programs in seventy academic areas. Students may pursue a "Transfer Ticket" associate degree program and, upon completion, transfer to a Connecticut State University as a junior to complete their bachelor's degree.

Tunxis Community College also offers an honors program for students who meet the prerequisites.

=== Students ===
In 2021, the main campus had 3,365 students, including 1,342 full-time and 2,023 part-time students. This included 60 percent females and 40 percent males, characterized as 55 percent White, 25 percent Hispanic/Latino, 8 percent Black, 5 percent two or more races, 4 percent races, 2 percent unknown, and 1 percent non-resident alien.

=== Faculty ===
In 2021, the student-to-faculty ratio was fifteen to one. Sharale W. Mathis is the campus president.

=== Accreditation ===
The college is accredited by the New England Commission of Higher Education through its parent institution.
