= Connecticut State Community College Quinebaug Valley =

Public college in Danielson, Connecticut, US

Coordinates: 41.8259°N 71.8923°W

- Former name: Quinebaug Valley Community College (1971–2023)
- Motto: Learners, Leaders, Partners
- Type: Public community college
- Established: September 27, 1971
- Parent institution: Connecticut State Community College
- Accreditation: New England Commission of Higher Education
- President: Mary Ellen Jukoski
- Location: 742 Upper Maple Street, Danielson, Connecticut, 06239, United States
- Campus: 68 acres (28 ha); Suburban
- Website: ctstate.edu/locations/quinebaug-valley

Connecticut State Community College Quinebaug Valley, previously Quinebaug Valley Community College, is a public community college campus in Danielson, Connecticut. It was established in 1971 and became a campus of Connecticut State Community College in 2023 with the merger of twelve institutions.

== History ==
Quinebaug Valley Community College opened on September 27, 1971, with 215 students. It was name for the Quinebaug River that flows through northeastern Connecticut. It held classes at Harvard H. Ellis Technical School and Killingly High School in Danielson, Connecticut. Robert E. Miller was the college' first president.

The college built a new campus on Upper Maple Street that opened in 1983. It added a center in Willimantic, Connecticut in 1986. The main campus was expanded by the addition of a 30,000 square foot West Wing in 2007 and a 38,000 square foot addition in 2014.

It became Connecticut State Community College Quinebaug Valley, a campus of Connecticut State Community College in 2023 with the merger of twelve institutions.

== Campus ==
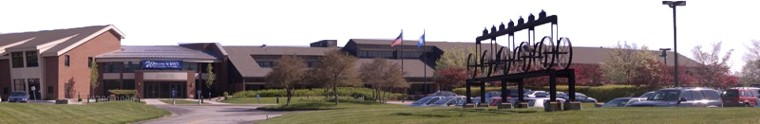
Connecticut State Community College Quinebaug Valley main campus

Connecticut State Community College Quinebaug Valley's main campus is located on 68 acres at 742 Upper Maple Street in Danielson, Connecticut. It includes a 10,000 square foot Advanced Manufacturing Technology Center that was added in 2016.

The college has a satellite location at 729 Main Street in Willimantic, Connecticut.

== Academics ==
=== Programs ===
The college offers associate degrees and certificate programs in 31 fields, including business administration, general studies, liberal studies, and liberal arts and sciences.

=== Students ===
In 2021, the college had 1,161 students, including 63 percent females and 37 percent males. Of those students, 78 percent were White, 12 percent were Hispanic/Latino, 4 percent were two or more races, 2 percent were Asian, 2 percent were Black, 1 percent were American Indian or Alaska native, and 1 percent were unknown.

=== Faculty ===
In 2021, the student-to-faculty ratio was thirteen to one. Mary Ellen Jukoski is the campus president.

=== Accreditation ===
Through the Connecticut State Community College, the campus is accredited by the New England Commission of Higher Education.
