= Connecticut State Community College Naugatuck Valley =

Public college in Waterbury, Connecticut, US

Coordinates: 41.547°N 73.0715°W

- Charles A. Ekstrom Hall
- Former names: Waterbury State Technical Institute (1962–1965); Waterbury State Technical College (1965–1992); Mattatuck Community College (1962–1992); Naugatuck Valley Community-Technical College (1992–1999); Naugatuck Valley Community College (1999–2023)
- Type: Public community college
- Established: 1962
- Parent institution: Connecticut State Community College
- President: Michael Rook
- Location: 750 Chase Parkway, Waterbury, Connecticut, 06708, United States
- Campus: 110 acres (45 ha); Suburban
- Website: ctstate.edu/locations/naugatuck-valley

Connecticut State Community College Naugatuck Valley is a public community college campus in Waterbury, Connecticut. It was established in 1962, adopting its current name in 2023 when Naugatuck Valley Community College merged with twelve other community colleges to form Connecticut State Community College, of which is its a campus. It offers numerous associate degrees, the most popular of which include general studies, liberal arts and sciences, business management, and nursing.

== History ==
Waterbury State Technical Institute was established in 1962 in Waterbury, Connecticut. Its original function was to train engineering technicians for local industries. In 1965, the Connecticut General Assembly upgraded the college into a technical college, Waterbury State Technical College. The college opened with a freshman class of 200 students. Kenneth Fogg was the college's first president. Waterbury State became a community college in 1967. Charles Ekstrom was its second president, serving from 1980 to 1992.

Mattatuck Community College was established in 1967. Initially, it held classes John F. Kennedy High School in Waterbury, with 288 full-time and 224 part-time students. It had 1,800 students and 42 full-time and nine part-time faculty in 1970.

Former seal

In 1992, Waterbury State merged with Mattatuck Community College to form Naugatuck Valley Community-Technical College. It became Naugatuck Valley Community College (NVCC) in 1999. NVCC is a two-year public college that is part of the Connecticut State Colleges & Universities system. Richard L. Sanders was its president from its formation until 2008, having first served as the president of Mattatuck Community College, starting in July 1984.

In 2023, Naugatuck Valley Community College merged with twelve other community colleges to form Connecticut State Community College. It became the Naugatuck Valley campus.

== Campus ==
=== Main campus ===
The 110-acre (0.45 km^{2}) main campus is located at 750 Chase Parkway in Waterbury, Connecticut. It has classrooms and laboratories for general and specialized use. The Learning Resource Center supports the college's mission and academic curricula through its specialized services and diverse collection of materials and online resources. The Student Center supports student activities and offers a game room and full-service cafeteria. NVCC is home to one of Connecticut's three observatories.

In 2009, Naugatuck Valley Community College opened its New Technology Building houses several high-technology learning environments, the school's full-service Culinary Arts program, the horticultural program, and the Automotive Technology program. NVCC's Technology Hall is a 100,000-square-foot, three-story glass and masonry structure. The facility provides teaching facilities for technical programs including automotive technology, computer technology, and computer-aided design, electronics and manufacturing laboratories, classrooms, administrative offices, a horticulture program located in a new greenhouse adjacent to the new building, and facilities for the college's hospitality, food service and hotel management program. The new facility replaces seven modular buildings that were erected on the campus in 1972. It also replaces the automotive program's leased facility on Thomaston Avenue in Waterbury.

The Founders Hall facility was the very first campus building, having been constructed in the early 1960s. The building had been recently vacated by the engineering department and was serving a hodgepodge of academic and noncredit programs at the isolated east end of campus. The New Founders Hall is home to the nursing and allied health curriculum at Naugatuck Valley Community College (NVCC).

=== Satellite campus ===
In 2016, the opened its second campus location at 190 Main Street in downtown Danbury, Connecticut. Labs, classrooms, offices, and conference rooms are located in this 20,000-square-foot building.

== Academics ==
The campus offers more than 100 associate degree and credit certificates and hundreds of non-credit courses. Students can earn in different fields, including liberal arts and sciences, general studies, humanities, health professions, business, management, and marketing. The campus has a student population of more than 8,000.

Its campus president is Michael Rooke.

== Student life ==
The campus provides cultural programs for the region in the Fine Arts Center which houses two theatres, music and dance studios, video studios, and rehearsal rooms. Student publish Fresh Ink literary journal.
