= Connecticut State Community College Manchester =

Public college in Manchester, Connecticut, US

Coordinates: 41.76116°N 72.56353°W

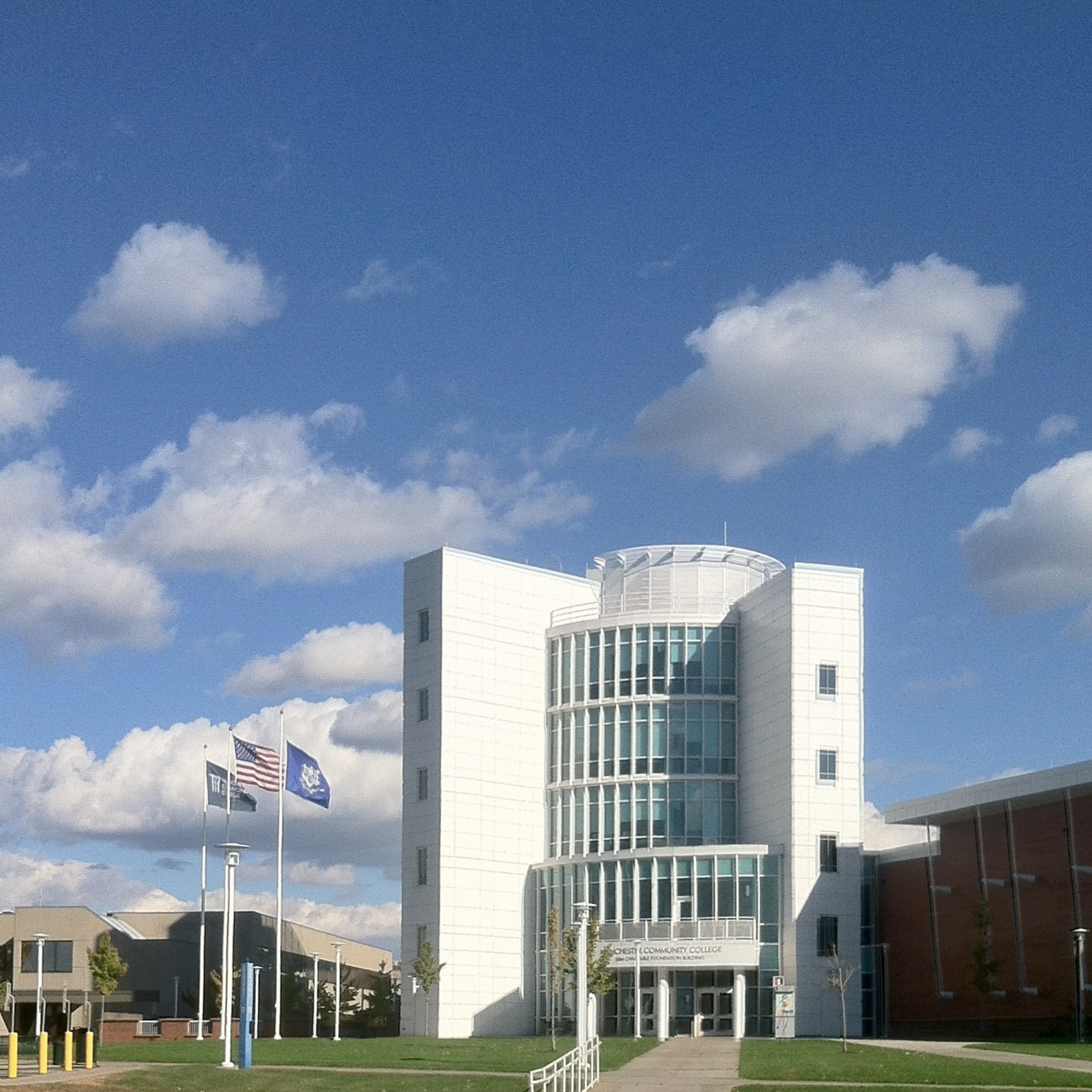
- Campus Rotunda
- Former names: Manchester Community Technical College; Manchester Community College
- Type: Public community college
- Established: 1963
- Parent institution: Connecticut State Colleges & Universities
- Accreditation: NECHE
- President: Joshua Moon-Johnson
- Faculty: 456 (Fall 2017)
- Students: 4,448 (2021)
- Location: Great Path, Manchester, Connecticut, 06040, United States
- Campus: 160 acres (0.65 km^{2}) Suburban
- Mascot: Cougar

Connecticut State Community College Manchester, formerly Manchester Community College, is a public community college campus in Manchester, Connecticut. Founded in 1963, it is the largest of the state's community college campuses. In 2023, merged to form and become a campus of the Connecticut State Community College.

== History ==
Manchester Community College was established in 1963 in Manchester, Connecticut. It has the largest service area of the Connecticut community colleges, being the primary community college for the towns of Andover, Bolton, Columbia, Coventry, East Hartford, Ellington, Glastonbury, Hebron, Mansfield, Marlborough, Rockville, South Windsor, Stafford, Storrs, Tolland, Union, Vernon, and Willington, in addition to Manchester. The college was called Manchester Community Technical College at one point.

In 1996, MCC was named an "Honor Institution" by the Harry S. Truman Scholarship Foundation due to its "remarkable history of nurturing and encouraging students' academic and intellectual abilities and motivation". The college remains the only American community college to have been recognized as such.

It is the third-oldest of the twelve community colleges governed by the Connecticut State Colleges & Universities system. It has an annual budget of more than $31 million.

It became the Connecticut State Community College Manchester with the merger of twelve institutions to form Connecticut State Community College on July 1, 2023. It is now a campus of that larger institution, which is accredited by the New England Commission of Higher Education.

== Campus ==
The college's campus is situated on 160 acres (0.65 km^{2}) on Great Path in Manchester, Connecticut. The suburban campus is mostly undeveloped, with large wooded areas and open land spaces.

The main buildings are the Learning Resource Center; the Arts, Sciences and Technologies Center; and the Frederick Lowe Building, which is the oldest building on the campus, having been dedicated in 1986. There are also six smaller single-classroom buildings located in the center of the college's courtyard, collectively known as "The Village," which house some of the specialized programs, including manufacturing technology and the musical arts.

Special facilities include PC and Macintosh computer labs, a library, a television studio, the SBM Charitable Foundation Auditorium, science and allied health labs, the Hans Weiss Newspace Gallery and fine art studios, and numerous study spaces. An outdoor bandshell hosts concerts and special events periodically throughout the year, including commencement in May.

For fitness and athletics, MCC has baseball, softball, and soccer fields. The Town of Manchester walking trails also pass through the campus, connecting it to the East Coast Greenway. The campus also features a large pond behind the bandshell, which is frequented by the early childhood education program as a sample field trip site.

The East Campus was a group of temporary classroom buildings and faculty offices that were dedicated in 1971. These single-story modular buildings were intended to be temporary and were said to have a lifespan of approximately 10 years. However, they remained in use for 31 years, until the Learning Resource Center and Arts, Sciences and Technologies Center opened in fall 2002. As of fall 2008, the East Campus buildings have been demolished, and the area is undergoing redevelopment.

== Academics ==
=== Programs ===
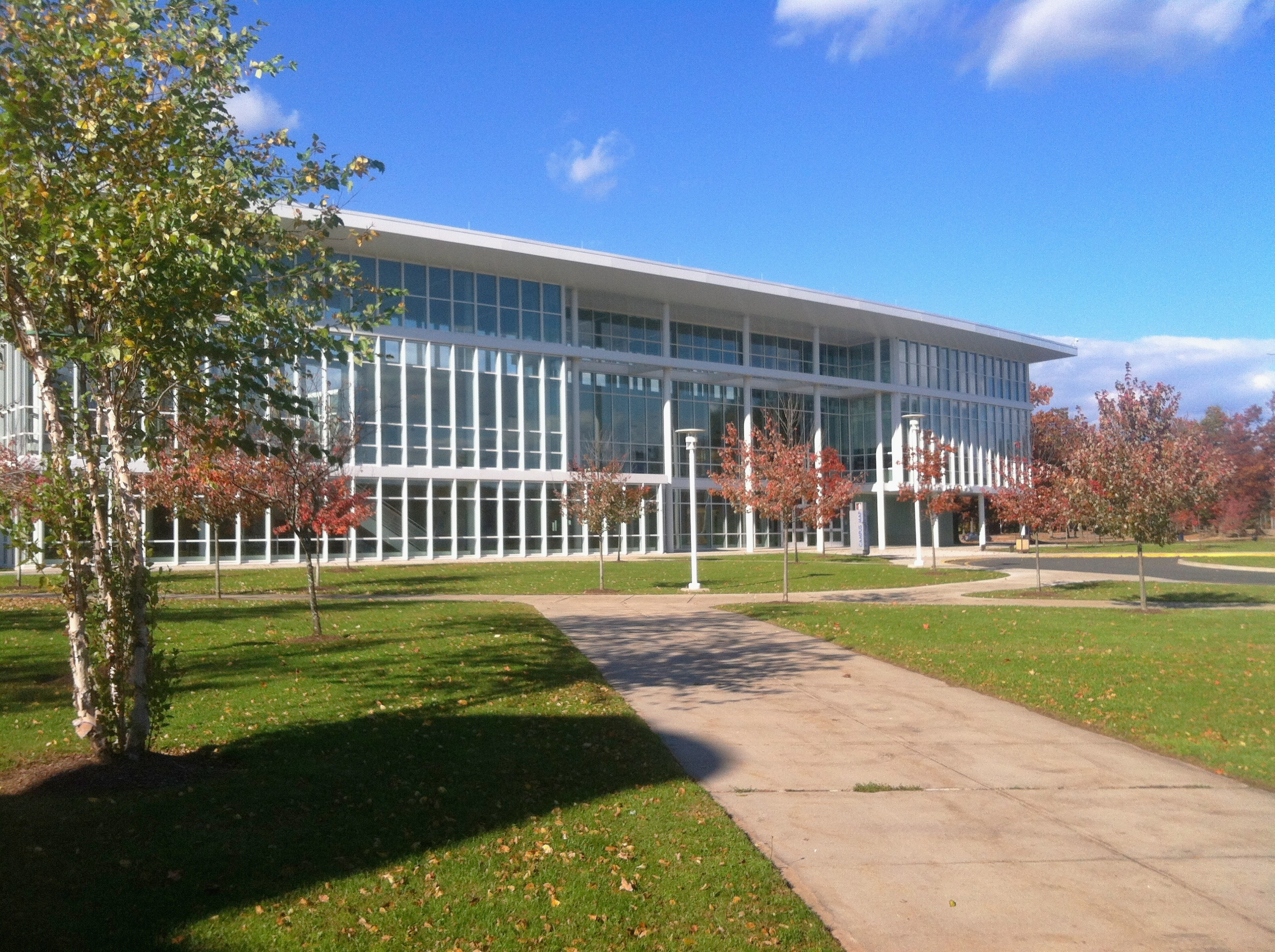
Great Path Academy

MCC offers associate in art, associate in science, and certificates in more than eighty disciplines, including accounting, bookkeeping, business/commerce, and general studies. The college has an honors program for students pursuing a more challenging curriculum. Through its Continuing Education division, MCC also offers a wide variety of programs throughout the year, including regular credit programs during the summer aimed at working adults.

The college is home to Great Path Academy, a middle college high school housed at the college that has an enrollment of more than 100 students.

=== Students ===
In 2021, the college had 4,448 students, including 1,468 full-time and 2,980 part-time students. These students were 57 percent females and 43 percent males, categorized as 49 percent were White, 21 percent were Hispanic/Latino, 18 percent Black, 6 percent Asian, 3 percent two or more races, and 2 percent unknown.

=== Faculty ===
In 2021, the college had a student-to-faculty ration of fourteen to one. The campus president is Joshua Moon-Johnson.

== Student life ==
The college has more than 35 student clubs and organizations, including business and pre-professional clubs, social groups, and cultural organizations. The college's student newspaper, the Live Wire, has received several awards from the Associated Collegiate Press at its national conventions during the paper's history, while the college's student-run Internet radio station, ICE Internet Radio, has been broadcasting since 2007. MCC has chapters of several honor societies, with the college's chapter of Phi Theta Kappa, Alpha Mu Gamma, Alpha Beta Gamma, and Epsilon Pi Tau. The college also hosts various seminars, workshops, exhibitions, and guest speakers each year.

The Fitness Center, open to all students, faculty, and staff, offers aerobics and weight-training facilities. Specialized courses in areas such as kickboxing, pilates, and fencing are also available.

== Athletics ==
Manchester Community College was the only Connecticut community college with an intercollegiate athletics program. The college hosted four sports teams – soccer and basketball for women, and soccer and baseball for men. The men's soccer team and women's basketball teams are particularly noted, frequently appearing in the top ten of the national rankings. In addition, the baseball team advanced to the NJCAA World Series in 1994, 2008, and 2009. All teams, known as the Cougars, competed in Region XXI of Division III of the National Junior College Athletic Association. In February 2013, the colleged ended its athletic program due to budget restrictions.

== Notable alumni ==
- Carol Lynn Curchoe - biologist
- Constance Belton Green - lawyer and faculty member
- Susan Johnson - Connecticut House of Representatives
- Edgar Kunz - poet
- Fred Norris - actor known for The Howard Stern Show
- Tammy Nuccio - Connecticut House of Representatives
- Ocean Vuong - writer
