= Constance Belton Green =

American lawyer

Constance Belton Green is an American lawyer who was the first African American woman to graduate from the University of Connecticut School of Law, in 1972.

== Life and career ==
Green was born and raised in Portsmouth, Virginia, where she attended segregated public schools. She graduated from the Hampton Institute and also took exchange classes at Cornell University, majoring in early childhood education. She switched her career to law when she met with recruiters from the UConn School of Law. While she felt greater pressure to prove herself, on account of her race and gender, she reported that she did not experience any racial discrimination from UConn faculty or students. However, she struggled to find a room to rent in Hartford, visiting twenty houses before someone agreed to rent to a single Black woman. She left the rental after her white landlord hosted a party whose attendees assumed she was a maid.

In 1980, Green became an assistant professor at Manchester Community College, where she coordinated the college's legal assistant education program. She served as an elected member and vice chair of the Bloomfield Board of Education during the 1980s before resigning in 1989 to work for the Connecticut State Department of Education. As of 1997, she was an education consultant and liaison to federal agencies for the State Department of Education. As of 2004, she was director of equity and diversity at Eastern Connecticut State University. In 2019, she authored Still We Rise: African Americans at the University of Connecticut School of Law, published by UConn. The book is a history of Black students and faculty at the law school.

Green lived in Bloomfield, Connecticut, as of 2004. Her husband, Alan Eugene Green (1945–2012), and one of her daughters, Lea Green, were also UConn Law alumni.
