= Connecticut State Community College Capital =

Public community college in Hartford, Connecticut, U.S.

Coordinates: 41°46′6″N 72°40′19″W

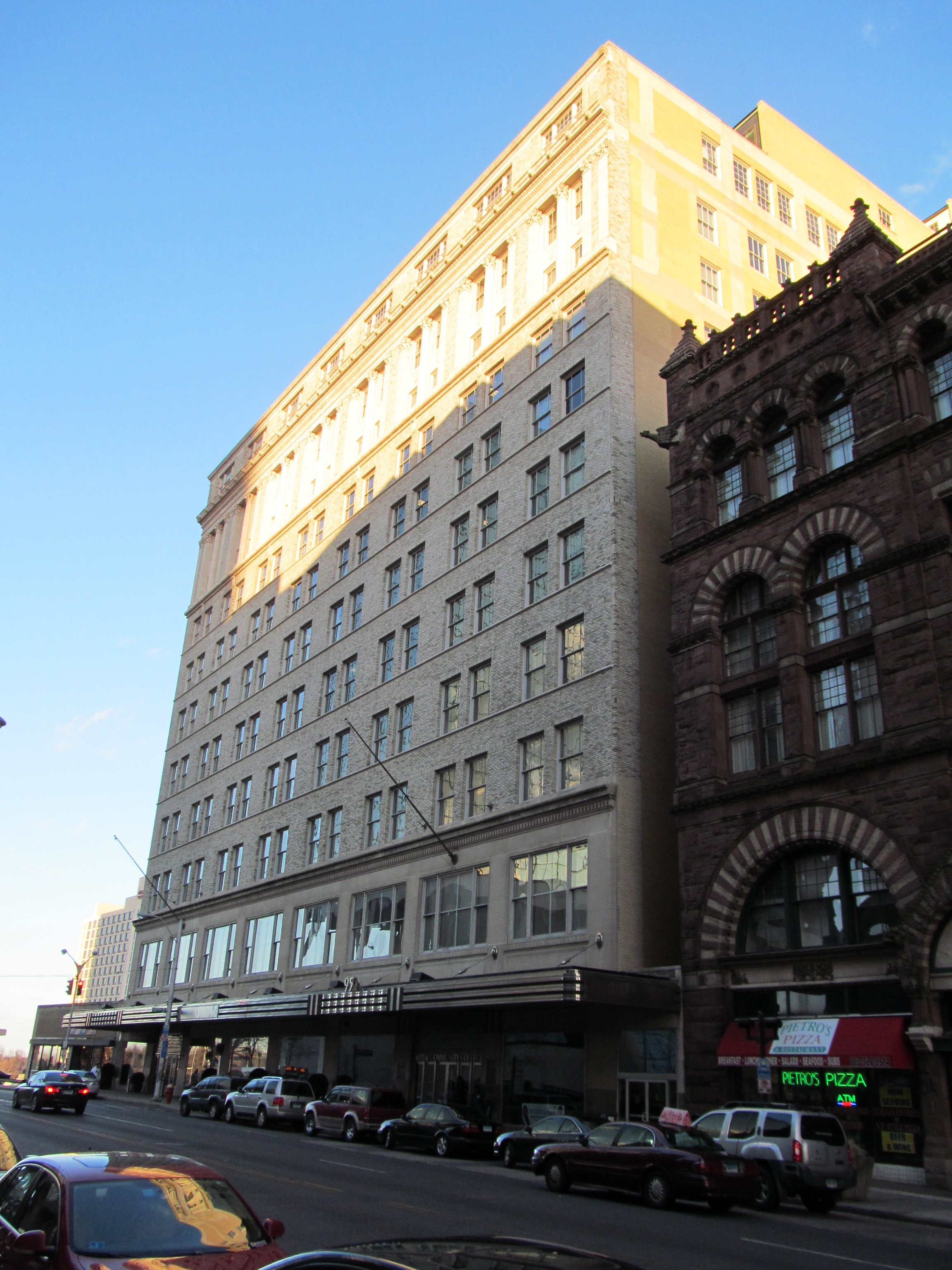
- Campus building in Downtown Hartford
- Former names: Greater Hartford Community College (1967–1992); Hartford State Technical College (1946–1992); Greater Hartford/Hartford State Community-Technical College (1999–19xx ?); Capital Community-Technical College (19xx ?–2000); Capital Community College (2000–2023)
- Type: Public community college
- Established: 1967
- Parent institution: Connecticut State Community College
- Accreditation: New England Association of Schools and Colleges
- President: Sharale W. Mathis
- Students: 3,302 (fall 2016.)
- Location: 950 Main Street, Hartford, Connecticut, 06103, United States
- Campus: Urban
- Mascot: The Commodores
- Website: ctstate.edu/locations/capital

Connecticut State Community College Capital, formerly Capital Community College, is a public community college campus in Hartford, Connecticut. Originally formed in 1967, it received its current name in 2023 when it merged with twelve other community colleges to form the Connecticut State Community College. It now operates as a campus of that institution.

== History ==
Capital began in 1967 as the Greater Hartford Community College. In 1992, it merged with Hartford State Technical College, founded in 1946, to become Greater Hartford/Hartford State Community-Technical College in a state-mandated consolidation. Later, that was shortened to Capital Community-Technical College.

In 2000, the college's name was changed to Capital Community College. In July 2023, Capital Community College became part of Connecticut State Community College, a merger of twelve individual institutions into one large community college. Its official name now is Connecticut State Community College Capital.

== Campus ==
The campus is located at 950 Main Street in Hartford, Connecticut. Before opening up in downtown Hartford, the college had two campuses in the city, one on Woodland Street and another on Flatbush Avenue. In 2002, the college made a significant step in helping the redevelopment in downtown Hartford by moving to the 1,913,000-square-foot (177,700 m^{2}) former G. Fox & Co. department store on Main Street in the heart of downtown.

== Academics ==
The college offers more than sixty associate degree and certificate programs. Its programs of study include the associate degree in nursing, the largest degree program for the preparation of registered nurses in Connecticut.

The college is accredited by the New England Commission of Higher Education. The campus president is Sharale Mathis. In 2022, its student-to-faculty ratio was twelve to one.

The college had an enrollment of 2,715 students in 2022, with 536 full-time and 2,179 part-time students. Of that number, 73 percent were female and 27 percent were male. 35 percent were Black, 29 percent were Hispanic/Latino, 21 percent were White, 5 percent were Asian, 2 percent were two or more races, and 7 percent were unknown.

== Notable alumni ==
- Jaki Shelton Green (Greater Hartford Community College), poet
- Pedro Segarra (Greater Hartford Community College), former mayor of Hartford, Connecticut
- Peter Tercyak, member of the Connecticut House of Representatives
