= Connecticut State Community College Norwalk =

Community college in Norwalk, Connecticut, U.S.

Coordinates: 41.1032°N 73.4521°W

- Former names: Norwalk Community College (1961–1992); Norwalk State Technical College (1961–1992); Norwalk Community-Technical College (1992–1999); Norwalk Community College (1999–2023)
- Type: Public community college
- Established: 1961
- Parent institution: Connecticut State Community College
- Accreditation: New England Commission of Higher Education
- President: Cheryl DeVonish
- Undergraduates: 6,000
- Location: 188 Richard Avenue, Norwalk, Connecticut, United States
- Campus: 30 acres (12 ha); Suburban
- Website: ctstate.edu

Connecticut State Community College Norwalk, also called CT State Community College Norwalk and is a public community college campus in Norwalk, Connecticut. Originally opened in 1961, it gained its current name in 2023 when it merged with twelve other community colleges to create its parent institution, the Connecticut State Community College. A commuter campus with no dormitories, the college's primary service area includes ten towns in southwest Fairfield County.

== History ==
Norwalk Community College and Norwalk State Technical College were each founded in 1961. In 1992, the colleges merged to become Norwalk Community-Technical College. In October 1999, the name format "community college" was approved for all state community colleges by the Board of Trustees of the Connecticut Community-Technical Colleges, changing it to the Norwalk Community College..

In 2009, the college graduated more than 700 students. More than 25 percent of the class of 2009 graduated from high schools outside the United States.

In 2023, Norwalk Community College merged with twelve other community colleges to form Connecticut State Community College. Now a campus of Connecticut State Community College, it was renamed Connecticut State Community College Norwalk.

== Campus ==
The college is located on a 30-acre (12 ha) campus at 188 Richards Avenue in Norwalk, Connecticut. The campus has two 140,000-square-foot (13,000 m^{2}) buildings, one on each side of the street. Classes are offered in both buildings. As a commuter school, it has no dormitories.

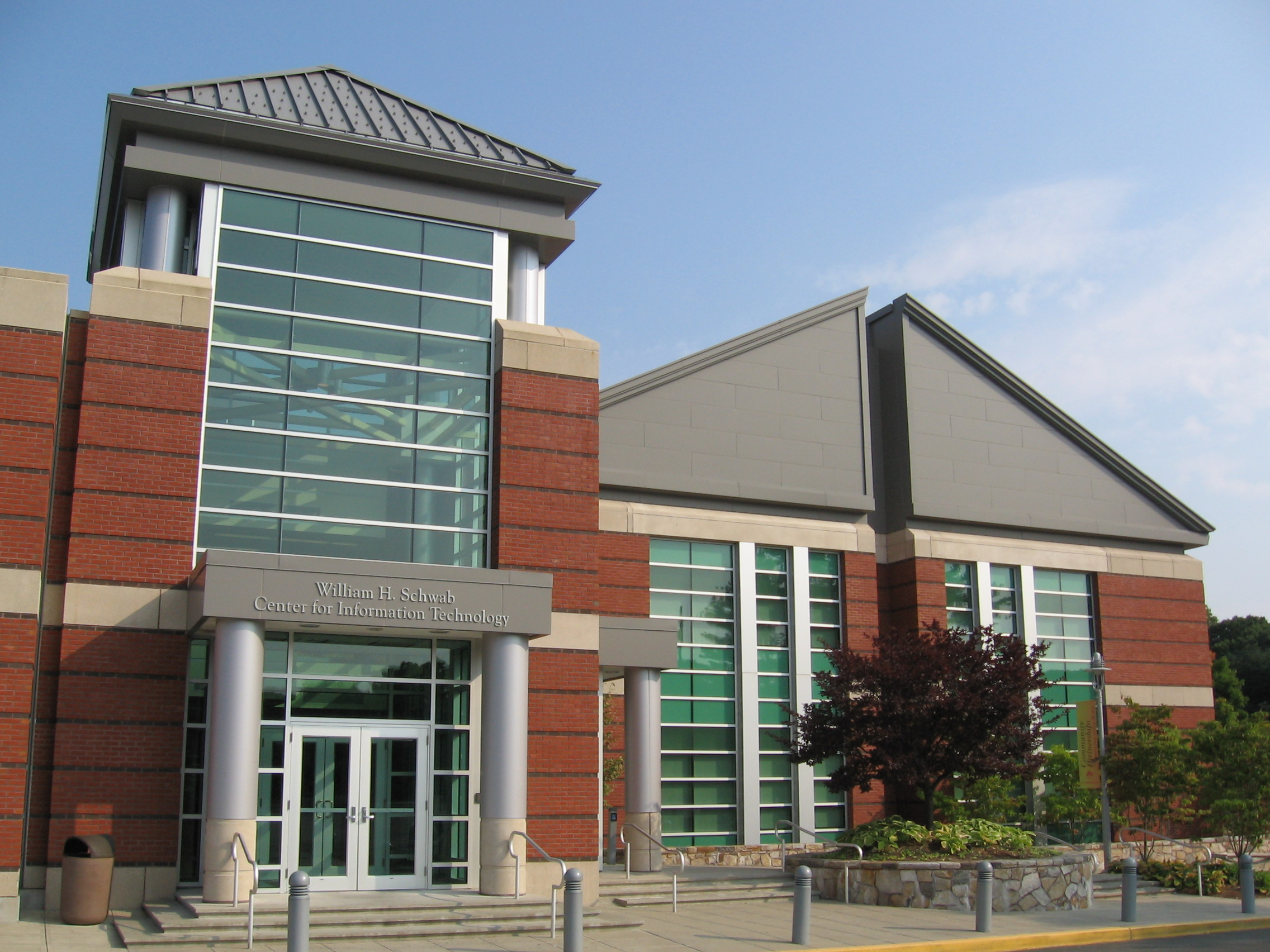
William H. Schwab Center for Information Technology

The East Campus building contains general classrooms, the library, nursing and computer laboratories, the language lab, art classrooms, administrative and faculty offices, the 298-seat PepsiCo Theater, a broadcast television studio, the Child Development Laboratory School, an art gallery, and the college bookstore. The West Campus building houses the William H. Schwab Center for Information Technology, science labs, general classrooms, the Culinary Arts Laboratory, dining room, engineering technology labs, faculty offices, academic center, Developmental Studies Center, gymnasium, fitness center, and cafeteria. The $30 million William H. Schwab Center for Information Technology opened in the fall of 2003.

== Academics ==
=== Programs ===
The college more than 90 certificates and degrees. Its degrees include an Associate in Arts, an Associate in Science, and an Associate in Applied Science degrees. It has a Business and Professional Development Center and a Workforce Education Institute which provide non-degree workforce development programs.

=== Faculty ===
The campus president is Cheryl DeVonish.

=== Students ===
NCC has about 6,200 students in credit programs and about 5,700 students in noncredit programs.

=== Everett I. L. Baker Library ===
The Everett I. L. Baker Library in the East Campus building has 60,000 books, periodicals, and newspapers, along with audiovisual materials and computers for student use. It also includes the Norwalk Campus Archives.

=== Accreditation ===
As part of the Connecticut State Community College, the campus is accredited by the New England Commission of Higher Education and approved by the Connecticut Board of Governors for Higher Education. In addition, some individual programs are accredited by national professional associations. Examples include the legal sssistant, nursing, respiratory care, and engineering technology curricula.

== Student life ==
Norwalk Community College has numerous student clubs and a chapter of Phi Theta Kappa academic honor society. Publications include The Voice student newspaper and Musings journal of the arts.

== Notable alumni ==
- Érik Bédard, Major league baseball pitcher, attended the school and led the baseball program to the Junior College World Series
- Matthew Berry, writer for ESPN.com and senior director of fantasy sports of ESPN
- Kenton Clarke (Norwalk Technical College, 1972), CEO of Computer Consulting Associates International Inc.
- Michael Fedele, Lieutenant Governor of Connecticut
- Adam Lanza, perpetrator of the Sandy Hook Elementary School shooting
- Richard Moccia (1970), Mayor of Norwalk, Connecticut
