= Connecticut State Community College Middlesex =

Public college in Middletown, Connecticut, US

Coordinates: 41.5384°N 72.6106°W

- Former name: Middlesex Community College (1966–2023)
- Type: Public community college
- Established: 1966
- Parent institution: Connecticut State Community College
- Accreditation: New England Association of Schools and Colleges
- President: Joshua Moon-Johnson
- Undergraduates: 4400
- Location: 100 Training Hill Road, Middletown, Connecticut, United States
- Campus: 38 acres (15 ha); City
- Mascot: Pegasus (former)
- Website: ctstate.edu/locations/middlesex

Connecticut State Community College Middlesex, formerly Middlesex Community College, is a public community college campus in Middletown, Connecticut, United States. Formed in 1966, it changed its name and became a campus of the Connecticut State Community College in 2023.

The college has about 4,400 students enrolled. It is a commuter school with no dormitories. It offers associate degrees, certificates, and specialist programs.

== History ==
Middlesex Community College was founded in 1966 as a branch campus of Manchester Community College. It became an independent community college in 1968. Initially, the college operated in space rented from the Middletown Public School district and loaned by the Connecticut Valley Hospital. In 1973, the college moved to its present campus overlooking the Connecticut River.

In 2023, it became one of twelve institutions that merged to form Connecticut State Community College. The renamed Connecticut State Community College Middlesex is now a campus of the larger institution.

== Campus ==
=== Main campus (Middletown) ===
The main campus is in Middletown, Connecticut at 100 Training Hill Road. It consists of 38-acre (15 ha) on a hillside overlooking the Connecticut River valley, about a mile and a half from the center of Middletown. It includes four main buildings: Snow, Wheaton, Founder's, and Chapman Hall.

The campus features general-purpose classrooms, computer classrooms, arts and media studios, and special-purpose laboratories, along with faculty and administrative offices, a cafeteria, bookstore, and multipurpose halls. New facilities such as the Pavilion, deck, solar patio, as well as the collaborative Learning Commons. It is a commuter school with no dormitories.

=== Meriden Center ===
In 2004, Middlesex opened a satellite learning site at 55 West Main Street in Meriden, Connecticut. Students can enroll in credit, credit-free, day, evening, and weekend courses at the Meriden campus.

== Academics ==
Connecticut State Community College Middlesex offers associate degrees, certificates, and specialist programs. Over the years, numerous signature programs were established, such as precision manufacturing, business and industry, new media production, and early childhood education. The college also offers an honors program for students who meet the prerequisites. Greater Meriden-Wallingford area business and industry can take advantage of education and training through Meriden's Internet Training Center.

Connecticut State Community College Middlesex has about 4,400 students enrolled. The college is accredited by the New England Association of Schools and Colleges through its parent institution. Joshua Moon-Johnson is the campus president.

== Student life ==
Connecticut State Community College Middlesex has chapters of Phi Theta Kappa and Mu Alpha Theta honor societies. Campus clubs include the Human Services Student Association, Students Promoting Equality, Acceptance and Knowledge (S.P.E.A.K.), the Computer Club, and the Math Club. There is also a Student Senate.
