= Charter Oak State College =

Community college in New Britain, Connecticut, US

Coordinates: 41°41′17″N 72°46′07″W

- Charter Oak State College
- Former name: Charter Oak College
- Motto: A Higher Degree of Online Learning
- Type: Public online college
- Established: 1973
- Parent institution: Connecticut State Colleges and Universities
- President: Michael Moriarty (interim)
- Provost: David Ferreira
- Students: 2,330
- Location: New Britain, Connecticut, United States
- Campus: Suburban
- Website: charteroak.edu

Charter Oak State College is a public online college based in New Britain, Connecticut, United States. The college was founded in 1973 by the Connecticut Legislature and offers associate, bachelor's, and master's degrees.

Charter Oak State College is part of the Connecticut State Colleges and Universities. It is accredited by the New England Commission of Higher Education and functions under the degree-granting authority of the Connecticut Board of Regents for Higher Education. Previously, the Board for State Academic Awards (BSAA), established in 1973, granted degrees through Charter Oak State College. In 2012, the Connecticut Board of Regents for Higher Education replaced the BSAA as Charter Oak State College's governing body.

Charter Oak State College is a distance learning institution that mainly serves the adult population and allows different opportunities for credit to be earned compared to a traditional college. Charter Oak has awarded over 19,000 degrees since its founding in 1973.

== Academics ==
Charter Oak State College can award the Associate degree (in both arts and science), the Bachelor of Arts degree, the Bachelor of Science degree, and, since 2015, the Master of Science degree. The bachelor's degree programs include several majors, as well as a General Studies degree with a wide selection of concentrations.

Michael Moriarty serves as interim president. Ken Udas has been appointed as the college's next president and is scheduled to start his term on October 30, 2026.

== Student demographics ==
Undergraduate demographics as of fall 2023
Race and ethnicity	Total
White	49%
Hispanic	22%
Black	21%
Asian	3%
Two or more races	2%
Unknown	1%
Economic diversity
Low-income (Note: The percentage of students who received an income-based federal Pell grant intended for low-income students.)	39%
Affluent (Note: The percentage of students who are a part of the American middle class at the bare minimum.)	61%

Charter Oak State College's adult students include members of the military, civilian federal and state employees, working adults pursuing first or second degrees, and students taking additional coursework in preparation for graduate school. Charter Oak State College's students are 65% female and range in age from 17 to 72 with an average age of 39. 69% of Charter Oak's students are Connecticut residents.

== Notable alumni ==
- Richard Borer, politician and non-profit executive
- Mary-Jane Foster, actress, sports-team owner, politician, and university administrator
- Robert Gandt, author and aviator
- Bobby Gibson, educator and politician
- Marvin Jones, professional football player
- Kevin Lembo, politician
- Jason Murphey, politician
- Zach Payne, politician
- Robyn Porter, politician
- Peter Reinhart, baker, educator, and author
- Andrew Skolnick, journalist and photographer
- Jerome Tang, college basketball coach
- Al Terzi, news anchor
- Larry Valencia, politician
