= Connecticut State Community College Asnuntuck =

Public college in Enfield, Connecticut, US

Coordinates: 41.9985°N 72.5754°W

- Other name: CT State Asnuntuck
- Former names: North Central Connecticut Community College (1969–1972); Asnuntuck Community College (1972–1993); Asnuntuck Community-Technical College (1993–1999); Asnuntuck Community College (1999–2023)
- Type: Public community college
- Established: 1969
- Parent institution: Connecticut State Community College
- Accreditation: New England Association of Schools and Colleges
- Academic affiliations: Space-grant
- President: Joshua Moon-Johnson
- Students: 1,945
- Location: Enfield, Connecticut, United States
- Campus: 35 acres (14 ha); Surburban
- Website: ctstate.edu/locations/asnuntuck

Connecticut State Community College Asnuntuck, formerly Asnuntuck Community College, is a public community college in Enfield, Connecticut, United States. In 2023, it was consolidated into Connecticut State Community College, a single accredited institution formed through the merger of Connecticut's twelve community colleges. As part of this restructuring, Asnuntuck became the Connecticut State Community College Asnuntuck campus.

== History ==
Connecticut State Community College Asnuntuck is a public institution established in 1969 as North Central Connecticut Community College, the twelfth institution in the Connecticut State Colleges and Universities system (CSCU). It was created to serve the towns of Enfield, Somers, Windsor Locks, Suffield, East Windsor, East Granby, Stafford, and Ellington. Its first president was Daniel McLaughlin.

Classes began in 1972 with an initial enrollment of 251. The college award twelve Associate in Science degrees and twenty Associate of Art degrees to the first graduating class in 1974. The college operated under provisional approval until it was accredited by the New England Association of Schools and Colleges in 1977.

In 1972, the board of trustees officially renamed it Asnuntuck Community College. "Asnuntuck", Native American for "fresh water", refers to the Podunk tribe that once resided in the area, to the nearby Connecticut River and Freshwater Brook, and to a strong interest in the environment and ecology. The campus is on land that was purchased from the Podunk Tribe of the Asnuntuck River in 1689.

The college has had three locations since its founding. It opened in the former North School building in the Thompsonville section of Enfield, Connecticut. The college moved to a leased warehouse on Phoenix Avenue in 1974, but it gradually outgrew that location. The college moved to its current location in 1983, the former Kosciuszko Junior High School at 170 Elm Street. The years between 1989 and 1994 saw extensive renovations to improve classroom and laboratory space, revamp the auditorium, and add an annex to house the Learning Resource Center.

The college has been an autonomous institution throughout most of its existence, except for a period from 1985 to 1989. During those years, it was part of the Capital Region Community College District with Greater Hartford Community College and Tunxis Community College in Farmington.

In 1992, the Connecticut legislature mandated merging the state's community and technical colleges. While there was no area technical college for an Asnuntuck merger, the legislature also required each community college to complement its general education with a technical focus, bringing about several programmatic changes, as well as the change to the name, Asnuntuck Community-Technical College. The technical focus remains, particularly in a recently established manufacturing technology program, but the state community colleges dropped the word "technical" from their names in 1999, returning to the simpler name, Asnuntuck Community College.

On October 23, 2013, Asnuntuck Community College student Nicholas Saucier videotaped an on-campus conversation about gun legislation that he had with Connecticut Governor Dannel Malloy. At the end of the conversation, campus security escorted Saucier off-campus. The college charged Saucier with harassment and making threats. When Saucier challenged the charges at an official hearing, the college refused to review the video evidence of the incident because they claimed that Saucier had recorded the video without permission. Saucier was placed on probation after initially being dismissed from the college. The Foundation for Individual Rights and Expression wrote a letter in January 2014 asking Asnuntuck Community College to reverse their dismissal of the student and uphold the student's free speech and due process rights. As of April 4, 2014, FIRE had not received any dispute directly from Asnuntuck Community College.

In 2023, Asnuntuck Community College merged with twelve other community colleges to form Connecticut State Community College. It became the Connecticut State Community College Asnuntuck.

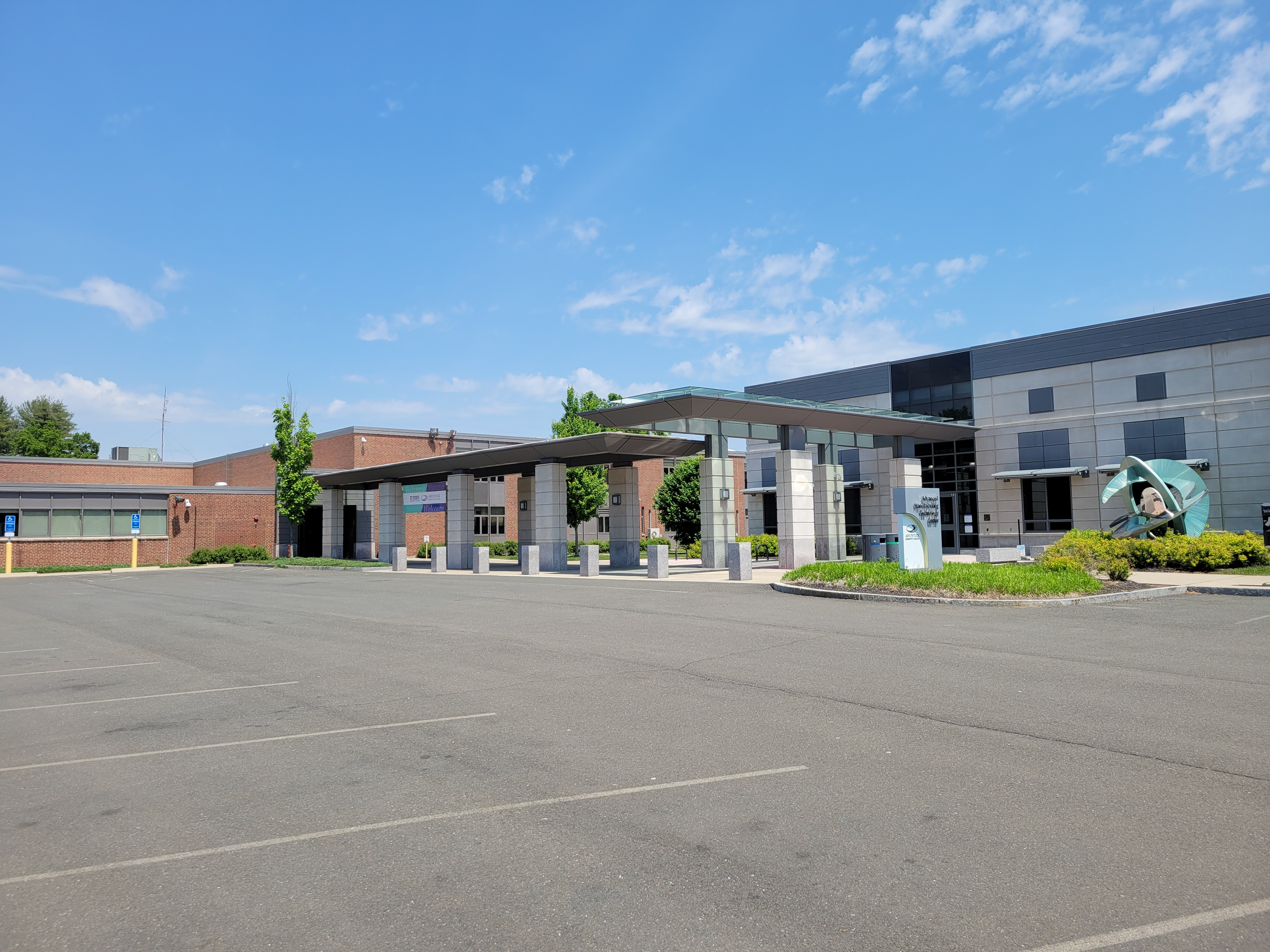
Advanced Manufacturing Technology Center

== Campus ==
Connecticut State Community College Asnuntuck has a suburban campus located at 170 Elm Street in Enfield, Connecticut which is within the Springfield, Massachusetts area. Its 35 acres (14 ha) campus includes the former Kosciuszko Junior High School and the Advanced Manufacturing Technology Center.

In 2016 Asnuntuck received state bond funding for campus improvements. The college was approved to receive $11.4 million for renovations and improvements including replacement of the roof; construction of a new building entrance; and the construction, renovation and improvement of student senate offices, conference areas, lounge, bookstore, a food service area with indoor and outdoor seating, and a community function area.

== Academics ==
The majority of students complete their studies at Asnuntuck and transfer to a four-year institution. The college offers associate degrees and certificate programs in 28 field. It also provides short-term workforce training. It provides training in machine technology, robotics and mechatronics technician, and welding and fabrication technologies through its Advanced Manufacturing Technology Center. Students are earn certification from the National Institute for Metalworking Skills and the American Welding Society.

Asnuntuck is accredited by the New England Association of Schools and Colleges. The college also has ISO 9001 and National Institute for Metalworking Skills accreditation.

The campus president is Joshua Moon-Johnson.

In 2025, the college had 1,264 undergraduate students, of which 454 are full-time and 810 are part-time students. The students are 56 percent male and 44 percent female as well as 70 percent White, 13 percent Hispanic, 7 percent Black, 5 percent multi-racial, 2 percent Asian, and 1 percent unknown.

== Student life ==
Asnuntuck has its own radio station, WACC-LP (107.7 FM).
