= Connecticut State Colleges & Universities =

Public university system in Connecticut

Connecticut State Colleges and Universities
- Seal of the Connecticut State University System
- Motto: Qui Transtulit Sustinet
- Type: Public university system
- Established: 1849; 177 years ago
- Chairman: Ari Santiago
- Chancellor: Natalie Braswell
- Students: 34,824 (2012)
- Undergraduates: 29,308 (2012)
- Postgraduates: 5,516 (2012)
- Location: Hartford, Connecticut, United States
- Website: www.ct.edu

Connecticut State University System locations

Headquarters in Hartford, Connecticut.

The Connecticut State Colleges & Universities (CSCU; formerly the Connecticut State University System) is a system of six public colleges and universities that include four Connecticut State Universities, Connecticut State Community College (with 12 campuses), and Charter Oak State College, the state's only online college. CSCU enrolls 85,000 students in certificate and degree programs and provides programs in liberal arts, sciences, fine arts, applied fields, and professional disciplines.

The first of the universities to be founded was Central Connecticut State University, established in 1849 as a normal school for teacher education. Over time the other three institutions were founded as normal schools and in 1959 they were converted into state colleges to reflect their expanded mission. From their founding until 1965, they were overseen by the Connecticut State Department of Education. In 1965 the General Assembly transferred control of the then-colleges to an independent board of trustees. In 1983, the four institutions were converted into universities, together constituting the Connecticut State University System.

The universities are governed by the Connecticut Board of Regents for Higher Education, established in 2011 to license and accredit the institutions and their programs, approve budgets, support planning, and coordinate technology operations. The interim Chancellor of the Connecticut State Colleges and Universities is Natalie Braswell. The Connecticut State University System Foundation, provides financial support from private donations to assist the missions of the universities.

The four universities – Central, Eastern, Southern and Western – offer graduate and undergraduate programs in more than 160 subject areas.

== History ==
Connecticut State University System (1983–2013)

Central Connecticut is the oldest public institution of higher education in Connecticut. It was established in 1849 as a "normal school", an institution whose sole purpose was to train teachers. The three other CSU institutions also were established as normal schools: Eastern Connecticut in 1889, Southern Connecticut State University in 1893 and Western Connecticut in 1903.

In 1959, the four institutions were renamed "state colleges" to reflect their expanded curricula and missions.

Twenty-four years later, in 1983, the colleges became universities in recognition of their greater mission and strategies. Today, the Connecticut State University System is the largest public university system in Connecticut.

From 1849 to 1965, the four institutions were administered by the Connecticut State Department of Education. On July 30, 1965, the state General Assembly created the Board of Trustees to oversee the colleges and to guide them to serve the public more effectively. The Connecticut State University System was established in 1983, bringing together the four state universities under a single board of trustees.

Public Act 11–48 and Public Act 11–61 enacted in 2011 consolidated governance under the Connecticut Board of Regents for Higher Education, which serves as the board of trustees when required under statute. The Connecticut State University System remains a legal entity under Connecticut law, but the four institutions became part of the larger Connecticut State Colleges and Universities (CSCU) system, alongside the state's community colleges and Charter Oak State College.

During the following decade, CSCU pursued greater systemwide integration. On July 1, 2023, Connecticut's twelve community colleges merged into a single accredited institution, Connecticut State Community College (CT State), with campuses across the state. The consolidation marked one of the most significant reorganizations of public higher education in Connecticut since the creation of CSCU. Charter Oak State College, which joined CSCU in 2011, expanded its role as the state's public online institution, offering degree and certificate programs primarily through online learning. Today, CSCU consists of four state universities, Connecticut State Community College, and Charter Oak State College, all governed by the Connecticut Board of Regents for Higher Education.

=== Executives ===
The Connecticut State Colleges & Universities system has had ten executives since the system was created in 1965.

CSCU leaders
No.	Leader	Term start	Term end	Ref.
Executive secretaries of the Board of Trustees for State Colleges (c. 1966 – c. 1977)
1	Harold J. Bingham	c. May 1966	May 6, 1967	
interim	J. Eugene Smith	May 9, 1967	May 31, 1967	
2	J. Eugene Smith	June 1, 1967	September 30, 1972	
Executive director of the Board of Trustees for State Colleges (c. 1977–1983)
1	James A. Frost (Note: Frost used the title "executive secretary" until c. 1977, when his title became "executive director", and finally "president" on December 9, 1983.)	October 1, 1972	May 31, 1985	
Presidents of Connecticut State University (1983–1996)
2	Dallas K. Beal	June 1, 1985	April 30, 1994	
interim	Thomas A. Porter	May 1, 1994	August 4, 1994	
Chancellors of Connecticut State University (1996–2011)
3	William J. Cibes Jr. (Note: The position of president became chancellor on July 1, 1996.)	August 5, 1994	January 19, 2006	
4	David G. Carter Sr.	January 20, 2006	February 28, 2011	
interim	Louise H. Feroe	March 1, 2011	June 30, 2011	
Presidents of the Board of Regents for Higher Education (2011–2013)
interim	Michael Meotti (Note: The position of chancellor became president on July 1, 2011.)	July 1, 2011	September 11, 2011	
interim	Robert A. Kennedy	September 12, 2011	February 29, 2012	
5	Robert A. Kennedy	February 29, 2012	October 12, 2012 (Note: Resigned under pressure.)	
interim	Philip E. Austin	October 2012	June 30, 2013	
Presidents of Connecticut State Colleges and Universities (CSCU) system (2013–2023)
6	Gregory W. Gray	July 1, 2013	September 27, 2015	
7	Mark E. Ojakian	September 28, 2015	December 31, 2020	
interim	Jane Gates	January 1, 2021	July 1, 2021	
Chancellors of the Connecticut State Colleges and Universities (CSCU) system (2023–present)
8	Terrence Cheng (Note: The position of president became chancellor on July 1, 2023.)	July 2, 2021	June 30, 2025 (Note: Removed by Board of Regents.)	
interim	O. John Maduko	July 1, 2025	April 24, 2026 (Note: Resigned)	
acting	Karen Buffkin	April 24, 2026	May 29, 2026 (Note: Put on administrative leave)	
acting	Lloyd Blanchard	May 29, 2026	June 14, 2026 (Note: Designated as acting chancellor until Braswell became new chancellor)	
interim	Natalie Braswell	June 15, 2026	Present	

Table notes:

== See also ==
- List of colleges and universities in Connecticut
- Connecticut Community Colleges
- University of Connecticut
- The Establishment of the Connecticut State University System, James A. Frost (1991)
