= New England Commission of Higher Education =

American postsecondary accreditor

- Abbreviation: NECHE
- Formation: 1885
- Legal status: Association
- Purpose: Higher education accreditation in the United States
- Headquarters: Wakefield, Massachusetts
- Region served: Connecticut, Maine, Massachusetts, New Hampshire, Rhode Island, and Vermont and international locations
- President: Lawrence M. Schall
- Affiliations: CHEA and ED
- Website: www.neche.org

The New England Commission of Higher Education (NECHE) is a voluntary, peer-based, non-profit membership organization that performs peer evaluation and accreditation of public and private universities and colleges in the United States and other countries. Until federal regulations changed on July 1, 2020, it was one of the seven regional accreditation organizations dating back 130 years. NECHE then became an institutional accreditor recognized by the United States Department of Education and the Council for Higher Education Accreditation.

Its headquarters are in Wakefield, Massachusetts. NECHE accredits over 200 institutions primarily in Connecticut, Maine, Massachusetts, New Hampshire, Rhode Island, and Vermont.

== Traditional service area ==
- Connecticut Office of Higher Education – Education in Connecticut
- Maine Department of Higher Education – Education in Maine
- Massachusetts Department of Higher Education – Education in Massachusetts
- New Hampshire Department of Higher Education – Education in New Hampshire
- Education in Rhode Island
- Education in Vermont

== See also ==
- Higher education accreditation
- Higher education accreditation in the United States
- List of recognized accreditation associations of higher learning
- List of recognized higher education accreditation organizations
- Educational accreditation
- New England Association of Schools and Colleges
- New England Board of Higher Education
- United States Department of Education
