= 1951 in literature =

If you really want to hear about it, the first thing you'll probably want to know is where I was born, and what my lousy childhood was like, and how my parents were occupied and all before they had me, and all that David Copperfield kind of crap, but I don't feel like going into it, if you want to know the truth.

— J. D. Salinger, opening lines of The Catcher in the Rye

This article contains information about the literary events and publications of 1951.

== Events ==
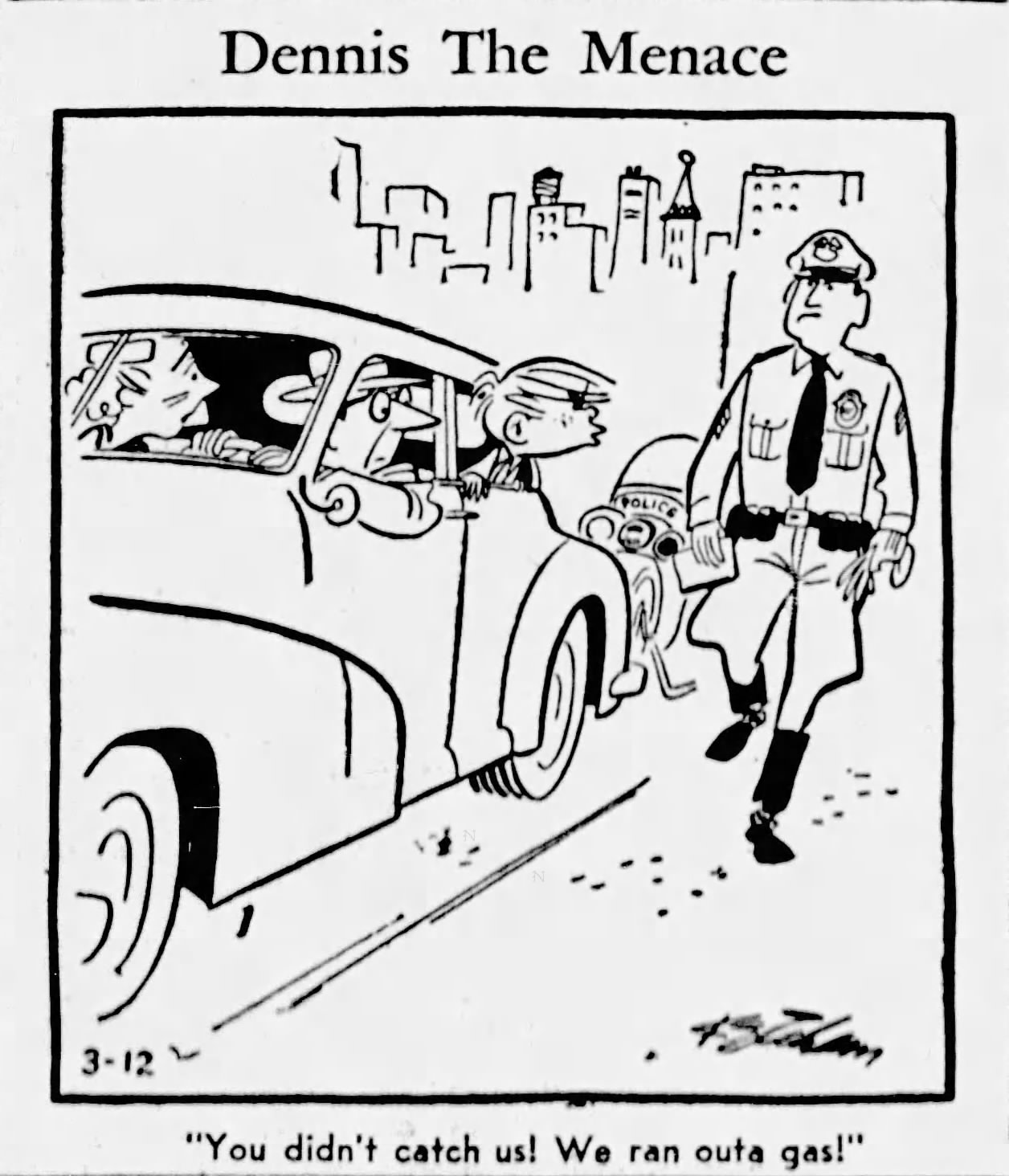
The first appearance of the American version of Dennis the Menace, March 1951

- January 12 – Janie Moore, C. S. Lewis' so-called adoptive mother, dies.
- March – The American writer Flannery O'Connor leaves hospital after being diagnosed with lupus at the age of 25.
- March 12 – Hank Ketcham's American comic strip Dennis the Menace first appears in 16 American newspapers. The strip is originally distributed by the Post-Hall Syndicate.
- March 17 – The homonymous British comic strip Dennis the Menace first appears in the Scottish anthology comic magazine The Beano, in issue 452 (dated March 17, 1951), on sale from March 12. It is the longest-running strip in the comic. The idea and name of the character emerged when the comic's editor heard a British music hall song with the chorus "I'm Dennis the Menace from Venice". The creation of Dennis in the 1950s had sales of The Beano soar.
- Spring – Arthur C. Clarke's short story "The Sentinel", which will form a basis for the film 2001: A Space Odyssey (1968) and a subsequent novel, is published as "Sentinel of Eternity" in the only issue ever produced of the American science fiction and fantasy pulp magazine 10 Story Fantasy.
- May – Joe Orton enters the Royal Academy of Dramatic Art in London, where he meets his lover and ultimate murderer Kenneth Halliwell.
- June 18 – Frank Hardy is acquitted of criminal libel in the Australian state of Victoria over his self-published 1950 roman à clef on corruption in Melbourne political life, Power Without Glory.
- July 16 – J. D. Salinger's coming-of-age story The Catcher in the Rye is published by Little, Brown and Company in New York City.
- September 6 – William S. Burroughs shoots and kills his common-law wife Joan Vollmer, apparently by accident, in Mexico City.
- December 16 – Noël Coward leaves his home, White Cliffs, on the south coast of England, having sold it to Ian Fleming.
- unknown dates
  - E. E. Cummings and Rachel Carson are awarded Guggenheim Fellowships. It is Cummings' second.
  - Janet Frame's first book, The Lagoon and Other Stories, is published by the Caxton Press (New Zealand) (dated 1952) while the author is a patient in Seacliff Lunatic Asylum, Seacliff, New Zealand, scheduled for a lobotomy. It is awarded the Hubert Church Memorial Award, at the time one of New Zealand's most prestigious literary prizes. This results in the cancellation of Frame's operation.
  - Béla Hamvas completes his epic novel Karnevál. He is banned from publication in Hungary at the time, so that it will appear only in 1985, 17 years after his death.
  - A Question of Upbringing, the first book in Anthony Powell's twelve-novel series A Dance to the Music of Time, is published by Heinemann in the U.K.
  - The custom of performing medieval mystery plays is revived at York and Chester, England.
  - The Théâtre national de la Colline in Paris is founded.

== New books ==
=== Fiction ===
- Martha Albrand – Desperate Moment
- Sholem Asch – Moses
- Isaac Asimov
  - Foundation
  - The Stars Like Dust
- Nigel Balchin – A Way Through the Wood
- Samuel Beckett – Molloy
- Ray Bradbury – The Illustrated Man (collection of short stories)
- Taylor Caldwell – The Balance Wheel
- Morley Callaghan – The Loved and the Lost
- Truman Capote – The Grass Harp
- L. Sprague de Camp
  - Rogue Queen
  - The Undesired Princess
- John Dickson Carr – The Devil in Velvet
- Henry Cecil – The Painswick Line
- Camilo José Cela – The Hive (La Colmena)
- James Hadley Chase – But a Short Time to Live
- Peter Cheyney – Ladies Won't Wait
- Agatha Christie
  - The Under Dog and Other Stories
  - They Came to Baghdad
- Arthur C. Clarke – Prelude to Space
- Beverly Cleary – Ellen Tebbits
- Julio Cortázar – Bestiario
- Robertson Davies – Tempest-Tost
- August Derleth – The Memoirs of Solar Pons
- Heimito von Doderer – Die Strudlhofstiege, oder Melzer und die Tiefe der Jahre (The Strudelhof Steps)
- Daphne du Maurier – My Cousin Rachel
- Friedrich Dürrenmatt – Suspicion
- Howard Fast – Spartacus
- Per Anders Fogelström – Sommaren med Monika
- Anthony Gilbert – Lady Killer
- Michael Gilbert – Death Has Deep Roots
- Julien Gracq – Le Rivage des Syrtes (The Opposing Shore)
- Graham Greene – The End of the Affair
- Henri René Guieu – Le Pionnier de l'atome
- Cyril Hare – An English Murder
- John Hawkes – The Beetle Leg
- Robert A. Heinlein – The Puppet Masters
- Elizabeth Jane Howard and Robert Aickman – We Are for the Dark: Six Ghost Stories
- Laurence Hyde – Southern Cross (wordless novel)
- James Jones – From Here to Eternity
- Margaret Kennedy – Lucy Carmichael
- A. M. Klein – The Second Scroll
- Wolfgang Koeppen – Tauben im Gras (Pigeons on the Grass)
- Kalki Krishnamurthy
  - Poiman Karadu
  - Ponniyin Selvan (பொன்னியின் செல்வன், The Son of Ponni; publication begins)
- Louis L'Amour – The Rustlers of the West Fork
- Eric Linklater – Laxdale Hall
- John Masters – Nightrunners of Bengal
- Carson McCullers – The Ballad of the Sad Café
- James A. Michener – Return to Paradise
- Nancy Mitford – The Blessing
- Gladys Mitchell – The Devil's Elbow
- Nicholas Monsarrat – The Cruel Sea
- Alberto Moravia – The Conformist (Il conformista)
- Robert Pinget – Entre Fantoine et Agapa
- Anthony Powell – A Question of Upbringing
- J. B. Priestley – Festival at Farbridge
- Ernest Raymond – A Chorus Ending
- J. D. Salinger – The Catcher in the Rye
- Ernst von Salomon – The Questionnaire (Der Fragebogen)
- Ooka Shohei (大岡 昇平) – Fires on the Plain (野火, Nobi)
- Vern Schneider – The Teahouse of the August Moon
- Georges Simenon
  - Maigret and the Burglar's Wife
  - Maigret, Lognon and the Gangsters
- Margit Söderholm – Meeting in Vienna
- Cardinal Spellman – The Foundling
- Howard Spring – The Houses in Between
- John Steinbeck – The Log from the Sea of Cortez
- Rex Stout
  - Curtains for Three
  - Murder by the Book
- William Styron – Lie Down in Darkness
- Elizabeth Taylor – A Game of Hide and Seek
- Josephine Tey – The Daughter of Time
- Anne de Tourville – Jabadao
- Henry Wade – Diplomat’s Folly
- Herman Wouk – The Caine Mutiny
- John Wyndham – The Day of the Triffids
- Frank Yerby – A Woman Called Fancy
- Marguerite Yourcenar – Memoirs of Hadrian (Mémoires d'Hadrien)
- Juan Eduardo Zúñiga – Inútiles totales (Totally useless)

=== Children and young people ===
- M. E. Atkinson – Castaway Camp (first in the Fricka series of five books)
- Rev. W. Awdry – Henry the Green Engine (sixth in The Railway Series of 42 books by him and his son Christopher Awdry)
- Viola Bayley – The Dark Lantern
- Margaret Biggs – The Blakes Come to Melling
- Anne de Vries – Into the Darkness (De Duisternis in, first in the Journey Through the Night – Reis door de nacht – series of four books)
- Eleanor Estes – Ginger Pye
- Rumer Godden – The Mousewife
- Cynthia Harnett – The Wool-Pack
- C. S. Lewis – Prince Caspian
- Elinor Lyon – We Daren't Go A'Hunting
- Gianni Rodari – l romanzo di Cipollino (The Adventures of the Little Onion)
- Sydney Taylor – All-of-a-Kind Family

=== Drama ===
- Muriel Box and Sydney Box – The Seventh Veil
- Agatha Christie – The Hollow
- Ian Hay – The White Sheep of the Family
- Lillian Hellman - The Autumn Garden
- Kenneth Horne – And This Was Odd
- Michael Clayton Hutton – The Happy Family
- Eugène Ionesco – The Lesson (La Leçon)
- Ronald Jeans – Count Your Blessings
- Maryat Lee – Dope!
- A. A. Milne – Before the Flood
- Lawrence Riley – Kin Hubbard
- Jean-Paul Sartre – The Devil and the Good Lord (Le Diable et le Bon Dieu)
- Peter Ustinov
  - The Love of Four Colonels
  - The Moment of Truth
- John Van Druten – I Am a Camera
- John Whiting
  - A Penny for a Song
  - Saint's Day (first performance)
- Tennessee Williams – The Rose Tattoo

=== Poetry ===
- Clark Ashton Smith – The Dark Chateau
- Frank O'Hara – A City Winter and Other Poems
- Iona and Peter Opie – The Oxford Dictionary of Nursery Rhymes

=== Non-fiction ===
- Nelson Algren – Chicago: City on the Make (essay)
- Lou Andreas-Salomé (died 1937) – Lebensrückblick (Looking Back)
- Hannah Arendt – The Origins of Totalitarianism
- Albert Camus – The Rebel (L'Homme révolté)
- Rachel Carson – The Sea Around Us
- Nirad C. Chaudhuri – The Autobiography of an Unknown Indian
- Wolfgang Clemen – The Development of Shakespeare's Imagery
- Thomas B. Costain – The Magnificent Century (second book in the Plantagenet or Pageant of England series)
- Daphne du Maurier (ed.) – The Young George du Maurier: a selection of his letters 1860–67
- James A. Frost – Life On The Upper Susquehanna 1783-1860
- Jacquetta Hawkes
  - A Land
  - A Guide to the Prehistoric and Roman Monuments in England and Wales
- Eric Hoffer – The True Believer: Thoughts On The Nature Of Mass Movements
- Karl Huber (executed 1943) – Leibniz
- Dumas Malone – Jefferson and the Rights of Man
- C. Wright Mills – White Collar: The American Middle Classes
- Vladimir Nabokov – Speak, Memory
- J. A. Schumpeter – Imperialism and Social Classes
- Tran Duc Thao – Phénoménologie et matérialisme dialectique

== Births ==
- January 1 – Ashfaq Hussain, Urdu poet
- January 3 – Ken Bruen, Irish crime fiction writer (died 2025)
- January 8 - Karen Tei Yamashita, American writer
- January 13 – Nigel Cox, New Zealand novelist
- January 22 – Steve J. Spears, Australian actor, singer, and playwright (died 2007)
- February 13 – Katja Lange-Müller, German novelist
- February 17 – Jagadish Mohanty, Indian novelist (died 2013)
- March 4 – Theresa Hak Kyung Cha, South Korean-born novelist and artist (died 1982)
- March 12 – Susan Musgrave, Canadian poet and children's writer
- March 17 – Lian Tanner, Australian children's writer
- March 22 – Sigrid Nunez, American writer and essayist
- April 5 – Guy Vanderhaeghe, Canadian author
- April 16 – Ioan Mihai Cochinescu, Romanian novelist and essayist
- April 19 – Pierre Lemaitre, French suspense novelist
- May 3 – Tatyana Tolstaya, Russian novelist, essayist and TV presenter
- May 9
  - Christopher Dewdney, Canadian poet
  - Joy Harjo, Native American poet
- May 15 – David Almond, English writer for children and young adults
- May 20 – Christie Blatchford, Canadian newspaper columnist, journalist, writer and broadcaster (died 2020)
- May 21 – Al Franken, American comedian, actor, writer and politician
- June 15 – Amir Barghashi, Iranian-born Swedish actor and dramatist
- June 22 – Rosario Murillo, Nicaraguan poet and political activist
- June 29 – Don Rosa, American writer and artist of Disney comics
- August 20 – Greg Bear, American science fiction writer
- August 24 – Orson Scott Card, American science fiction writer
- September 14 – Volodymyr Melnykov, Ukrainian poet, writer, songwriter and composer
- September 15 – Jared Taylor, American author and journalist
- September 20 – Javier Marías, Spanish novelist
- September 29 – Andrés Caicedo, Colombian novelist and cinema critic (suicide 1977)
- October 3 – Bernard Cooper, American writer
- October 11 – Louise Rennison, English author and comedian (died 2016)
- October 12 – Peter Flannery, English dramatist
- October 17 – Clark Parent, Haitian novelist, musician and politician
- November 18 - Dennis Foon, Canadian playwright, screenwriter and novelist
- December 6 – Tomson Highway, Canadian and Cree playwright, novelist and children's author
- December 8 – Bill Bryson, American travel writer
- December 20 – Peter May, Scottish novelist and television dramatist
- December 22 – Charles de Lint, Canadian fantasy author and Celtic folk musician
- Unknown dates
  - Mohammed Achaari, Moroccan writer
  - Carol Birch, English novelist

== Deaths ==
- January 6 – Maila Talvio, Finnish writer, nominated for the Nobel Prize in Literature (born 1871)
- January 7 – René Guénon, French philosophical writer (born 1886)
- January 10 – Sinclair Lewis, American novelist (born 1885)
- January 29 – James Bridie, Scottish dramatist (born 1888)
- February 13 – Lloyd C. Douglas, American author (born 1877)
- February 16 – Henri-René Lenormand, French dramatist (born 1882)
- February 19 – André Gide, French author (born 1869)
- February 28 – Vsevolod Vishnevsky, Russian dramatist and screenwriter (born 1900)
- March 11 – János Zsupánek, Prekmurje Slovene poet and author (born 1861)
- March 25 – Oscar Micheaux, African American author, film director and producer (born 1884)
- April 3 – Henrik Visnapuu, Estonian poet and dramatist (born 1890)
- April 9 – Sadegh Hedayat, Iranian-born novelist (born 1903; suicide)
- April 12 - Henry De Vere Stacpoole. Irish author (born 1863)
- April 29 – Ludwig Wittgenstein, Austrian philosopher (born 1889)
- May 2 – Alphonse de Châteaubriant, French writer (born 1877)
- May 25 – Paula von Preradović, Austrian poet and writer (born 1887)
- May 30 – Hermann Broch, Austrian writer (born 1886)
- June 10 – Håkon Evjenth, Norwegian children's writer (born 1894)
- June 11 – W. C. Sellar, Scottish humorist (born 1898)
- August 14 – William Randolph Hearst, American newspaper tycoon (born 1863)
- August 18 – Richard Malden, English editor, classical and Biblical scholar, and ghost story writer (born 1879)
- August 31 – Abraham Cahan, American Jewish journalist and novelist (born 1860)
- September 2 – Antoine Bibesco, Romanian dramatist (born 1878)
- September 7 – F. G. Loring, English writer and naval officer (born 1869)
- September 28 – Petre P. Negulescu, Romanian philosopher (born 1870)
- October 20 – Vincent Duffey, American playwright (born 1893)
- November 5 – I. C. Vissarion, Romanian novelist, dramatist, poet and science writer (born 1879)
- November 27 – Timrava (Božena Slančíková), Slovak novelist, short story writer and playwright (born 1867)
- December 4 – Pedro Salinas, Spanish poet (born 1891)
- December 10 – Algernon Blackwood, English novelist and journalist (born 1869)

== Awards ==
- Carnegie Medal for children's literature: Cynthia Harnett, The Wool-Pack
- Friedenspreis des Deutschen Buchhandels: Albert Schweitzer
- Frost Medal: Wallace Stevens
- James Tait Black Memorial Prize:
  - Fiction: Chapman Mortimer, Father Goose
  - Biography: Noel Annan, Leslie Stephen
- Newbery Medal: Elizabeth Yates, Amos Fortune, Free Man
- Nobel Prize in Literature: Pär Lagerkvist
- Premio Nadal: Luis Romero, La noria
- Pulitzer Prize:
  - Drama: no award given
  - Fiction: Conrad Richter, The Town
  - Poetry: Carl Sandburg, Complete Poems
- Hugo Award:
  - Best Novella: Robert A. Heinlein, The Man Who Sold the Moon

== Notes ==
- Hahn, Daniel (2015). The Oxford Companion to Children's Literature (2nd ed.). Oxford. University Press. ISBN 9780198715542.
