= Bibliography of New York =

The following is a bibliography of New York. New York is a U.S. state in the Mid-Atlantic region of the Northeastern United States. New York is commonly known as the "Empire State" and sometimes the "Excelsior State". It is the nation's third most populous state at over 19 million people. The capital of the state is Albany and its most populous city is New York City. New York is often referred to as New York State to distinguish it from New York City.

== General reference ==
- Eisenstadt, Peter, ed. (2005). The Encyclopedia of New York State. Syracuse, New York: Syracuse University Press. ISBN 0-8156-0808-X.
- Livermore, Garet D. "Revisiting 'The Cooperstown Idea': The Evolution of the New York State Historical Association." Public Historian 33.3 (2011): 70-89 https://doi.org/10.1525/tph.2011.33.3.70

== History ==
=== General history ===
- Brodhead, John Romeyn (1874) [1853]. History of the State of New York. Vol. 1 (Rev. ed.). New York: Harper & Brothers. OCLC 1046507659, and History of the State of New York. Vol. 2 (1st ed.). New York: Harper & Brothers. 1871. OCLC 68771132.
- Dearstyne, Bruce W. (2022) [2015]. The Spirit of New York: Defining Events in the Empire State's History. Excelsior Editions (2nd ed.). Albany: State University of New York Press. doi:10.1515/9781438487151. ISBN 978-1-4384-8715-1.
- Dearstyne, Bruce W., ed. (2026). Revolutionary New York: 250 Years of Social Change (First hardcover ed.). Albany, NY: State University of New York Press. ISBN 9798855804911. OCLC 1572662337.
- Ellis, David M.; Frost, James A.; Syrett, Harold C.; Carman, Harry J. (1967) [1957]. A History of New York State (rev. ed.). Ithaca: Cornell University Press, in cooperation with the New York State Historical Association. OCLC 950568.
- French, J. H. (1860). Historical and Statistical Gazetteer of New York State. Syracuse: R. Pearsall Smith. OCLC 670360781.
- Frost, James Arthur (1951). Life on the Upper Susquehanna, 1783–1860. New York: King's Crown Press. OCLC 988185144.
- Ingalls, Robert P. (1975). Herbert H. Lehman and New York's Little New Deal. With a foreword by George Meany. New York University Press. ISBN 978-0-8147-3750-7.
- Klein, Milton M., ed. (2001). The Empire State: A History of New York. Ithaca & London: Cornell University Press, with the New York State Historical Association. ISBN 978-0-8014-3866-0.
- Writers' Program of the Works Progress Administration in the State of New York (1940). New York: A Guide to the Empire State. American Guide Series. New York: Oxford University Press, sponsored by the New York State Historical Association. OCLC 1157151980.

=== Colonial times ===
- Gehring, Charles T. (2000). Fort Orange Records 1656–1678. Syracuse, New York: Syracuse University Press. ISBN 978-0-585-30922-4.
- Kammen, Michael (1996) [1975]. Colonial New York: a History. New York City: Oxford University Press. ISBN 0-19-510779-9. online free
- Knickerbocker, Diedrich (1820). A History of New York: From the Beginning of the World to the End of the Dutch Dynasty. London: John Murray. OCLC 265731022. (satire)
- Kupperberg, Paul, ed. A Primary Source History of the Colony of New York (The Rosen Publishing Group, 2005).
- Van Laer, A. J. F. (translator and editor) (1908). Van Rensselaer Bowier Manuscripts. Albany: University of the State of New York. OCLC 9261526.
- Venema, Janny (2003). Beverwijck: A Dutch Village on the American Frontier, 1652–1664. Hilversum: Verloren. ISBN 0-7914-6079-7.

=== Specialty topics ===
- Baker, Paula. The Moral Frameworks of Public Life: Gender, Politics, and the State in Rural New York, 1870–1930 (1991)
- Bernstein, Peter L. Wedding of the Waters: The Erie Canal and the Making of a Great Nation (2005).
- Boles, James M. When There Were Poor Houses: Early Care in Rural New York 1808–1950 (2011)
- Cross, Whitney R. The Burned-over District; the social and intellectual history of enthusiastic religion in western New York, 1800–1850 (1950) online
- Goodier, Susan. No votes for women: the New York state anti-suffrage movement (U of Illinois Press, 2012).
- Gunn, L. Ray. "The Crisis of Authority in the Antebellum States: New York, 1820-1860." Review of Politics 41.2 (1979): 273-297 online.
- Fein, Michael R. Paving the way: New York road building and the American State, 1880–1956 (UP of Kansas, 2008).
- Haydon, Roger, ed. Upstate travels : British views of nineteenth-century New York (1982) online
- Johnson, Curtis D. Islands of Holiness: Rural Religion in Upstate New York, 1790–1860 (2012)
- Koeppel, Gerard. Bond of Union: Building the Erie Canal and the American Empire. (2009).
- Norton, John R. "New York State Government and the Economy: 1819-1846." New York History 34.3 (1953): 298-314 online.
- Plotch, Philip Mark. Politics Across the Hudson: The Tappan Zee Megaproject (Rutgers UP, 2018).
- Sernett, Milton. North Star Country: Upstate New York and the Crusade for African American Freedom (2001).
- Sowers, Don Conger. The financial history of New York State from 1789 to 1912 (1914) online.
- Starr, Timothy. Railroad Wars of New York State (Arcadia, 2012).
- Taft, Pauline Dakin. The happy valley; the elegant eighties in upstate New York (1965) online; heavily illustrated
- Wellman, Judith. Grassroots Reform in the Burned-over District of Upstate New York: Religion, Abolitionism, and Democracy (2016)
- Wilson, Edmund. Upstate: records and recollections of northern New York (1971) online

== By municipality ==
=== By city ===
==== Albany ====
- Button, Daniel Evan (2003). Take City Hall!. Whitston Publishing Company. ISBN 978-0-87875-542-4.
- Grondahl, Paul (2007). Mayor Erastus Corning: Albany Icon, Albany Enigma. Albany: State University of New York Press. ISBN 978-0-7914-7294-1.
- Howell, George Rogers; Jonathan Tenney (1886). Bi-centennial History of Albany: History of the County of Albany, N.Y. from 1609 to 1886 (Volume I). New York City: W. W. Munsell & Co. OCLC 11543538.
- Howell, George Rogers; Jonathan Tenney (1886). Bi-centennial History of Albany: History of the County of Albany, N.Y. from 1609 to 1886 (Volume II). New York City: W. W. Munsell & Co. OCLC 11543538.
- Kennedy, William (1983). O Albany!. Viking Press. ISBN 978-0-670-52087-9.
- McEneny, John (2006). Albany, Capital City on the Hudson: An Illustrated History. Sun Valley, California: American Historical Press. ISBN 1-892724-53-7.
- Munsell, Joel (1869). The Annals of Albany (2nd ed.). Albany: Joel Munsell. OCLC 11500714.
- Munsell, Joel (1865). Collections on the History of Albany: from its Discovery to the Present Time (Volume 1). Joel Munsell. OCLC 2750413.
- Reynolds, Cuyler (1906). Albany Chronicles: A History of the City Arranged Chronologically, From the Earliest Settlement to the Present Time. Albany: J. B. Lyon Company. OCLC 457804870.
- Rittner, Don (2000). Images of America: Albany. Charleston, South Carolina: Arcadia Publishing. ISBN 0-7385-0088-7.
- Rittner, Don (2002). Then & Now: Albany. Charleston, South Carolina: Arcadia Publishing. ISBN 0-7385-1142-0.
- Rittner, Don (2009). Remembering Albany: Heritage on the Hudson. Charleston, South Carolina: History Press. ISBN 978-1-59629-770-8.
- Roberts, Warren (2010). A Place in History: Albany in the Age of Revolution, 1775–1825. SUNY Press. ISBN 978-1-4384-3329-5.
- Venema, Janny (2003). Beverwijck: A Dutch Village on the American Frontier, 1652–1664. Hilversum: Verloren. ISBN 0-7914-6079-7.
- Waite, Diana S. (1993). Albany Architecture: A Guide to the City. Albany: Mount Ida Press. ISBN 0-9625368-1-4.
- Weise, Arthur James (1884). The History of the City of Albany, New York, from the Discovery of the Great River in 1524 by Verrazzano to the Present Time. Albany: E.H. Bender. OCLC 337558.
- Whish, John D. (1917). Albany Guide Book. Albany: J.B. Lyon Company. OCLC 17438709.
- The Albany Lumber Trade: Its History and Extent. Albany: The Argus Company. 1872. OCLC 8260640.
- The Charter of the City of Albany; and the Laws and Ordinances Ordained and Established by the Mayor, Aldermen and Commonalty of the Said City, in Common Council Convened. Albany: Barber and Southwick. 1800. OCLC 55813771.

==== Buffalo ====
- Borchert, James, and Susan Borchert. "Downtown, Uptown, Out of Town: Diverging Patterns of Upper-Class Residential Landscapes in Buffalo, Pittsburgh, and Cleveland, 1885-1935." Social Science History 26.2 (2002): 311–346.
- Gerber, David A. The Making of an American Pluralism: Buffalo, New York, 1825–60 (U of Illinois Press, 1989)
- Goldman, Mark. High hopes: The rise and decline of Buffalo, New York (Suny Press, 1983)

==== Troy ====
- Rittner, Don (2002). Troy, NY: A Collar City History. Arcadia Publishing. ISBN 0-7385-2368-2.
- City of Troy (1906). Charter of and laws relating to the city of Troy: as amended at the close of the legislative session of 1906. Troy Observer Co. OCLC 13208186.
- Weise, Arthur James (1886). The city of Troy and its vicinity. Troy, New York: Edward Green. OCLC 8989214.
- Weise, Arthur James (1891). Troy's one hundred years, 1789–1889. Troy, New York: William H. Young. OCLC 17346272.
- Weise, Arthur James (1876). History of the city of Troy: from the Expulsion of the Mohegan Indians to the Present Centennial Year of Independence of the United States of America, 1876. Troy, New York: William H. Young. OCLC 12930415.

=== By county ===
==== Rensselaer County ====
- Anderson, George Baker (1897). Landmarks of Rensselaer County New York. Syracuse, New York: D. Mason and Company. OCLC 1728151.
- Hayner, Rutherford (1925). Troy and Rensselaer County New York: A History. New York: Lewis Historical Publishing Company, Inc. OCLC 22524006.
- Sylvester, Nathaniel Bartlett (1880). History of Rensselaer Co., New York with Illustrations and Biographical Sketches of its Prominent Men and Pioneers. Philadelphia: Everts & Peck. OCLC 3496287.
- Weise, Arthur James (1880). History of the Seventeen Towns of Rensselaer County from the Colonization of the Manor of Rensselaerwyck to the Present Time. Troy, New York: J. M. Francis & Tucker. OCLC 6637788 – via Internet Archive.

== Topics ==
- Curran, Robert Emmett, ed. Shaping American Catholicism: Maryland and New York, 1805–1915 (2012) excerpt and text search

== See also ==
- Topic overview:
  - New York (state)
  - Outline of New York (state)
  - Index of New York (state)–related articles
- List of bibliographies on American history
