= Settled Out of Court =

Settled Out of Court may refer to:

- Settled out of court
- Settled Out of Court (film), a 1925 British silent drama film
- Settled Out of Court (novel), a 1959 comedy crime novel
- Settled Out of Court (play), a 1960 comedy thriller play, based on the novel
