= Natural causes (disambiguation) =

In medicine, natural causes are a manner of death when the death is attributable to illness or an internal malfunction of the body.

Natural causes may also refer to:

- Natural Causes, a 1972 album by Richard Landis
- Natural Causes (Skylar Grey album), 2016
- Natural Causes (1985 film), an Australian television movie which aired in 1986
- Natural Causes (1994 film), an action–drama thriller film
- Natural Causes (novel), a 1953 novel by Henry Cecil
- Natural Causes, a novel by Michael Palmer
- Natural Causes, a book about the supplement industry by Dan Hurley
- Natural Causes, a documentary about Andrew Lees

== See also ==
- Act of God, in insurance, an unpredictable or extreme act of nature caused without human intervention or agency
