= Daniel Hurley =

Daniel Hurley may refer to:

- Daniel T. K. Hurley (born 1943), American lawyer and judge
- Daniel Hurley (American football), American football player
- Dan Hurley (born 1973), American basketball coach
- Dan Hurley (author) (born 1957), American health author
