= Age in America =

Book 2015

- Author: Nicholas L. Syrett; Corinne T. Field
- Publisher: New York University Press
- Publication date: 2015
- Pages: 352
- ISBN: 978-1479870011

Age in America: The Colonial Era to the Present is a book edited by Corinne T. Field and Nicholas L. Syrett. It explores how the different views of age have shaped American culture and law.
