= According to the Evidence =

1954 novel

- First edition
- Author: Henry Cecil
- Language: English
- Genre: Comedy crime
- Publisher: Chapman and Hall
- Publication date: 1954
- Publication place: United Kingdom
- Media type: Print

According to the Evidence is a 1954 comedy crime novel by the British writer Henry Cecil. An ex-army officer and a former criminal join forces to make sure that the man who killed a murderer is acquitted of murder himself.

In 1967, it was adapted into a successful play of the same title by Cecil, Felicity Douglas and Basil Dawson, who had previously co-written another hit adaptation of his novel Alibi for a Judge. This ran for 260 performances at the Savoy Theatre in London's West End. The cast included Douglas Wilmer, Muriel Pavlow, Naunton Wayne and Richard Warner.

== Bibliography ==
- Kabatchnik, Amnon. Blood on the Stage, 1950-1975: Milestone Plays of Crime, Mystery, and Detection. Scarecrow Press, 2011.
- Reilly, John M. Twentieth Century Crime & Mystery Writers. Springer, 2015.
