= Carl-Anders Dymling =

Swedish film producer and director

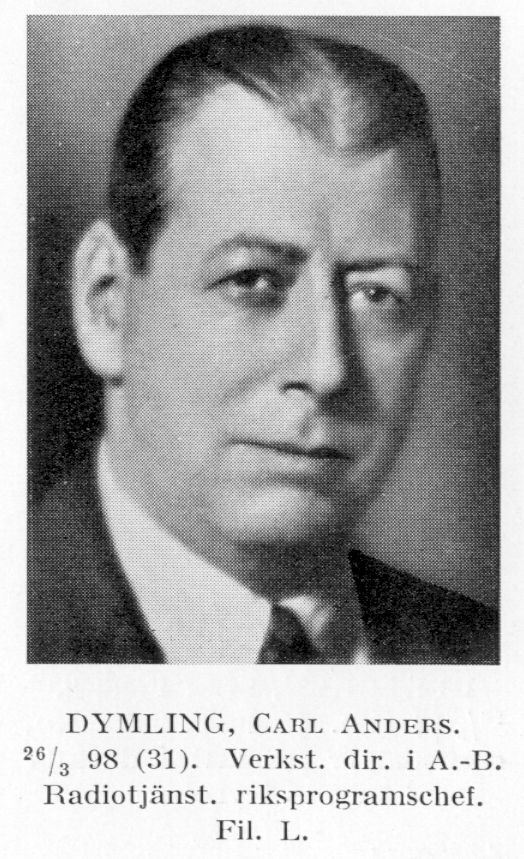
- Born: 26 May 1898; Gothenburg, Sweden
- Died: 2 June 1961 (aged 63); Stockholm, Sweden
- Occupation: Producer

Carl-Anders Dymling (1898-1961) was a Swedish film producer and director.

== Biography ==
Dymling became a Candidate of Philosophy at the University of Gothenburg in 1921 and a Philosophy Licentiate in literary history in 1925. In 1931 he became head of Radioteatern in Stockholm. Between 1942 and his death in 1961, he was President of Svensk Filmindustri, heading the county's largest film company. He initiated a policy of making prestigious, artistic productions that was less than successful. Although he was resistant to the making of the melodrama Sunshine Follows Rain, based on Margit Söderholm's novel, the 1946 release turned out to be the company's most profitable film of the sound era.

== Bibliography ==
- Gunnar Iverson, Astrid Soderbergh Widding & Tytti Soila. Nordic National Cinemas. Routledge, 2005.
