= No Bail for the Judge =

1952 novel

- 1959 edition
- Author: Henry Cecil
- Language: English
- Genre: Comedy crime
- Publisher: Chapman and Hall
- Publication date: 1952
- Publication place: United Kingdom
- Media type: Print

No Bail for the Judge is 1952 comedy crime novel by the British writer Henry Cecil. It was published in America by Harper Publications. It was the second novel of Cecil, himself a judge, and along with Brothers in Law is one of his best known.

Alfred Hitchcock planned to make a film out of the novel, starring Audrey Hepburn, in 1959. Filming was cancelled when Hepburn became pregnant. It has been described as "one of the most fascinating of Hitchcock's unrealized projects".

== Synopsis ==
A High Court judge finds himself accused of murdering a prostitute. To clear his name his daughter enlists the help of a criminal who organises an investigation amongst the streetwalkers of London to find the real culprit.

== Bibliography ==
- Allen, Richard & Ishii-Gonzales, Sam . Hitchcock: Past and Future. Routledge, 2004.
- Reilly, John M. Twentieth Century Crime & Mystery Writers. Springer, 2015.
- White, Terry. Justice Denoted: The Legal Thriller in American, British, and Continental Courtroom Literature. Greenwood Publishing Group, 2003.
