= All the World's Delights =

1953 film by Rolf Husberg

- Directed by: Rolf Husberg
- Written by: Rolf Husberg
- Based on: All the World's Delights by Margit Söderholm
- Produced by: Rune Waldekranz
- Starring: Ulla Jacobsson; Birger Malmsten; Kenne Fant
- Cinematography: Hilding Bladh; Rune Ericson
- Edited by: Rolf Husberg
- Music by: Sven Sköld
- Production company: Sandrew-Baumanfilm
- Distributed by: Sandrew-Baumanfilm
- Release date: 21 September 1953
- Running time: 111 minutes
- Country: Sweden
- Language: Swedish

All the World's Delights (Swedish: All jordens fröjd) is a 1953 Swedish historical drama film directed by Rolf Husberg and starring Ulla Jacobsson, Birger Malmsten and Kenne Fant. It is based on the 1946 novel of the same title by Margit Söderholm.

The film's sets were designed by the art director Nils Nilsson.

== Cast ==
- Ulla Jacobsson as Lisbet Enarsdotter
- Birger Malmsten as Mats Eliasson
- Kenne Fant as Erik Ersson
- Solveig Hedengran as Ester
- Lars Elldin as Jerker Enarsson
- Carl Ström as Grandpa
- Edla Rothgardt as Grandma
- Gösta Cederlund as Germundsfar
- Wiktor Andersson as Byskräddare
- Erik 'Bullen' Berglund as Ålderman
- Märta Dorff as Anna
- Gerd Ericsson as Fkicka i Mårtensgården
- Albin Erlandzon as Slaktare
- Gustaf Färingborg as Larsson, länsman
- Gösta Ganner as Lasse
- Gösta Gustafson as Jonke
- Haide Göransson as Karin Larsson
- Amy Jelf as Bonddotter
- Torsten Lilliecrona as Mickel
- Signe Lundberg-Settergren as Lisbets släkting
- Ninni Löfberg as Brita
- Wilma Malmlöf as Klok-Anna
- Karin Miller as Bonddotter
- Aurore Palmgren as Ingemarsmor
- Ulf Qvarsebo as Anders Ersson
- Olav Riégo as Prost
- Emy Storm as Brud på Mårtensgården
- Bengt Sundmark as Halvar

== Bibliography ==
- Per Olov Qvist & Peter von Bagh. Guide to the Cinema of Sweden and Finland. Greenwood Publishing Group, 2000.
