= Friends at Court =

1956 novel

- First edition
- Author: Henry Cecil
- Language: English
- Genre: Comedy
- Publisher: Michael Joseph
- Publication date: 1956
- Publication place: United Kingdom
- Media type: Print
- Preceded by: Brothers in Law
- Followed by: Sober as a Judge

Friends at Court is a 1956 comedy novel by the British writer Henry Cecil. It was published in the United States the following year by Harper Publications. It is a sequel to his bestseller Brothers in Law. Roger Thursby, the hero of the original novel, is now flourishing in the legal profession and has hopes of soon being made a Queen's Counsel. It was followed in 1962 by a third book in the series Sober as a Judge.

== Bibliography ==
- Reilly, John M. Twentieth Century Crime & Mystery Writers. Springer, 2015.
- White, Terry. Justice Denoted: The Legal Thriller in American, British, and Continental Courtroom Literature. Greenwood Publishing Group, 2003
