= American Child Bride =

2016 book

- Author: Nicholas L. Syrett
- Language: English
- Publisher: University of North Carolina Press
- Publication date: 2016
- ISBN: 978-1469629537

American Child Bride: A History of Minors and Marriage in the United States is a book by Nicholas L. Syrett.
