= All the World's Delights (novel) =

1946 novel by Margit Söderholm

- Author: Margit Söderholm
- Language: Swedish
- Genre: Historical
- Publication date: 1946
- Publication place: Sweden
- Media type: Print

All the World's Delights (Swedish: All jordens fröjd) is a 1946 Swedish historical novel by Margit Söderholm.

== Film adaptation ==
In 1953 it was made into a film of the same title directed by Rolf Husberg and starring Ulla Jacobsson.

== Bibliography ==
- Goble, Alan. The Complete Index to Literary Sources in Film. Walter de Gruyter, 1999.
- Gaster, Adrian. The International Authors and Writers Who's Who. International Biographical Centre, 1977.
