= Settled Out of Court (novel) =

1959 novel

- First edition
- Author: Henry Cecil
- Language: English
- Genre: Comedy crime
- Publisher: Michael Joseph
- Publication date: 1959
- Publication place: United Kingdom
- Media type: Print

Settled Out of Court is a 1959 comedy crime novel by the British writer Henry Cecil. It was published in the United States by Harper.

In 1960 it was adapted into a play of the same title co-written by Cecil and William Saroyan. It was a success running for nearly a year at the Savoy Theatre in London's West End.

== Bibliography ==
- Kabatchnik, Amnon. Blood on the Stage, 1950-1975: Milestone Plays of Crime, Mystery, and Detection. Scarecrow Press, 2011.
- Reilly, John M. Twentieth Century Crime & Mystery Writers. Springer, 2015.
