= Susquehanna Valley =

River valley in New York, Pennsylvania, and Maryland

Coordinates: 41°58′N 75°45′W

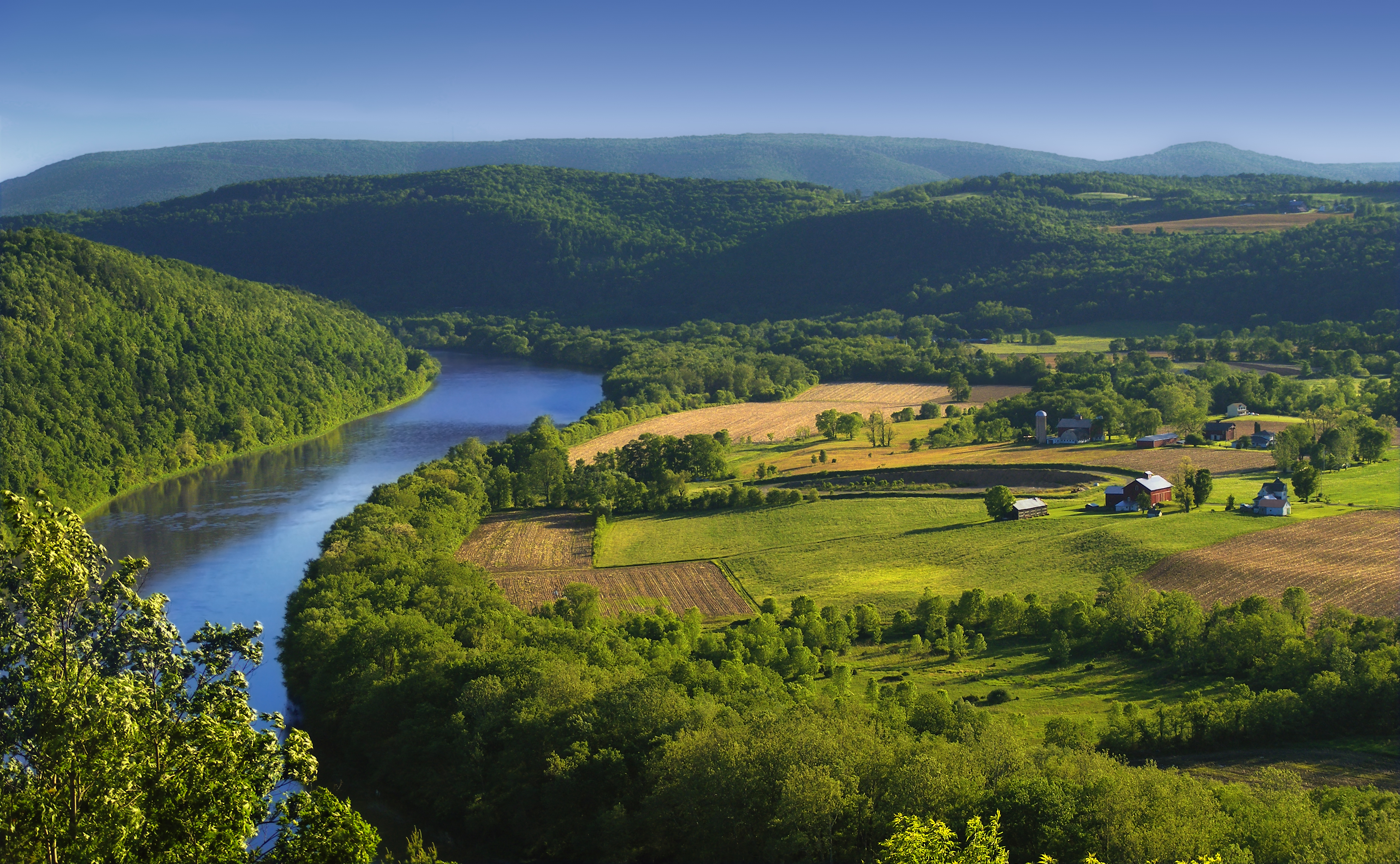
Susquehanna River in Bradford County, Pennsylvania

The Susquehanna Valley is a region of low-lying land that borders the Susquehanna River in the U.S. states of New York, Pennsylvania, and Maryland. The valley consists of areas that lie along the main branch of the river, which flows from Upstate New York through Pennsylvania and Maryland into the Chesapeake Bay, as well as areas that lie along the shorter West Branch in Pennsylvania.

== History and architectural features ==
As of 2014, seventeen of the oldest covered bridges in the United States were located in the Susquehanna Valley.

== Geography ==
Historians and environmentalists at the Chesapeake Conservancy have described the Susquehanna River as the "lifeblood" of the Chesapeake Bay and also as "extension of the Susquehanna Valley that the Atlantic Ocean has steadily flooded over the last 15,000 years."

Within Pennsylvania, the Susquehanna Valley is linked inextricably with the Chesapeake Bay watershed, which extends from Virginia, West Virginia, Washington, D.C., and Maryland through Delaware, Pennsylvania and New York. Pennsylvania's connections to the watershed are "primarily in the counties along the Susquehanna River, the West Branch of the Susquehanna, and their tributaries," according to Shelby Splain. "Located in the middle of the commonwealth, about half of the land in Pennsylvania drains into it."

== Communities in the valley ==
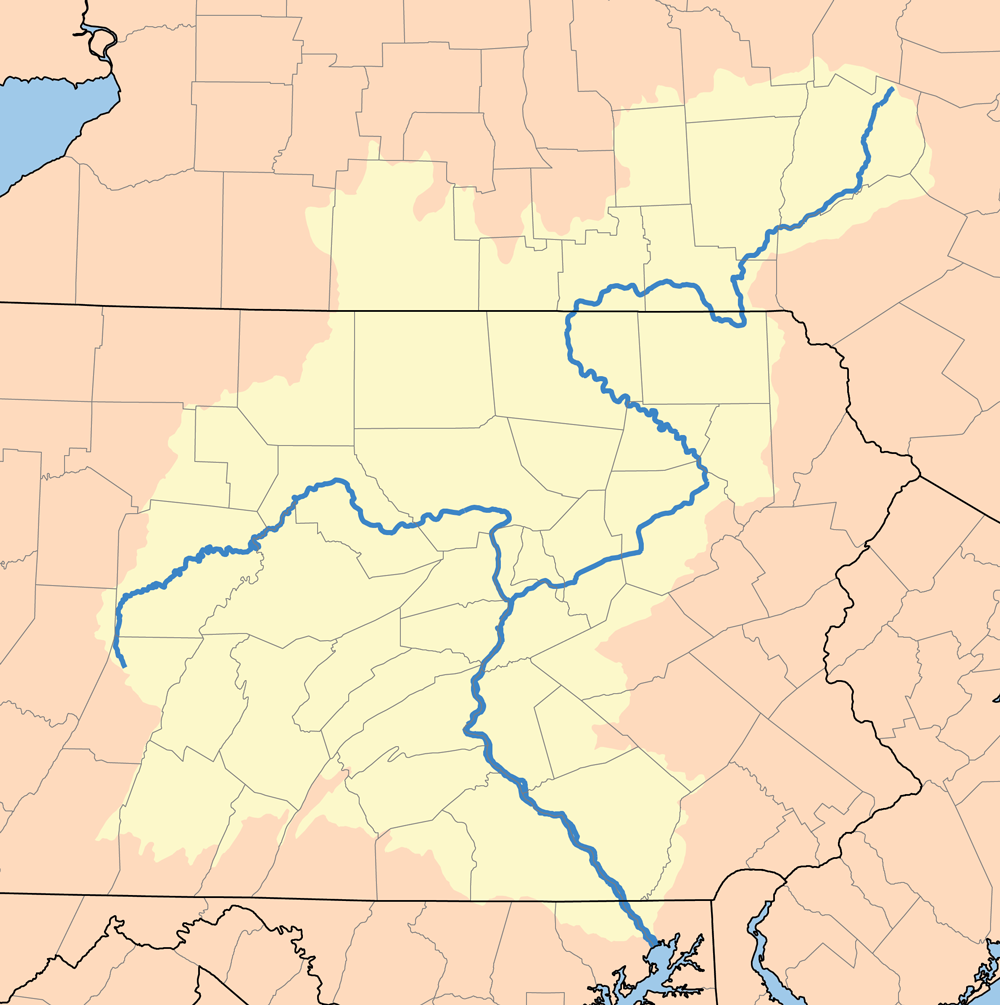
The Susquehanna Watershed incorporates all the valley sidewalls within the Susquehanna Valley, including large areas of the southern tier counties of lower New York state, the majority of central Pennsylvania's Susquehanna Gap above and past Lancaster and York County into upper Maryland, where it meets the headwaters of the Chesapeake Bay above Aberdeen, Maryland.

=== Main Branch ===
==== Cities ====
- Oneonta, New York
- Binghamton, New York
- Wilkes-Barre, Pennsylvania
- Scranton, Pennsylvania
- Sunbury, Pennsylvania
- Harrisburg, Pennsylvania
- Lancaster, Pennsylvania
- Pittston, Pennsylvania
- York, Pennsylvania
- Havre de Grace, Maryland

==== Counties ====
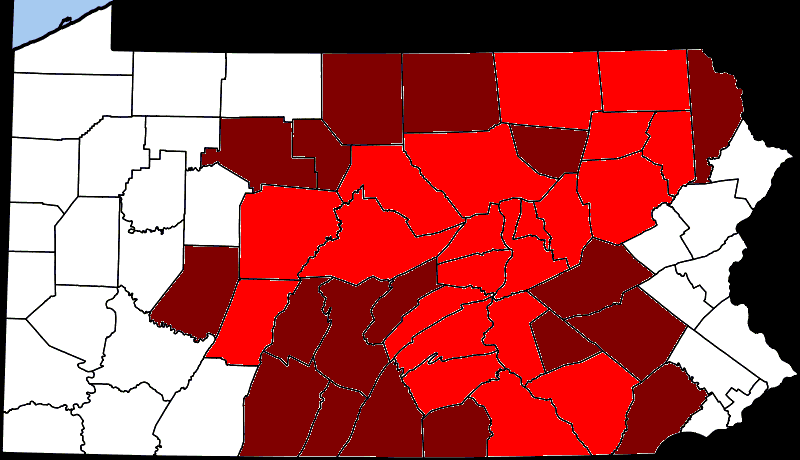
Counties constituting the Susquehanna Valley region of Pennsylvania. Counties in red are those in which the Susquehanna River and West Branch physically flow, while dark red counties are part of the watershed.

- Otsego County, New York
- Delaware County, New York
- Chenango County, New York
- Broome County, New York
- Susquehanna County, Pennsylvania
- Tioga County, New York
- Bradford County, Pennsylvania
- Wyoming County, Pennsylvania
- Lackawanna County, Pennsylvania
- Luzerne County, Pennsylvania
- Columbia County, Pennsylvania
- Montour County, Pennsylvania
- Potter County, Pennsylvania
- Tioga County, Pennsylvania
- Northumberland County, Pennsylvania
- Snyder County, Pennsylvania
- Juniata County, Pennsylvania
- Perry County, Pennsylvania
- Dauphin County, Pennsylvania
- Cumberland County, Pennsylvania
- York County, Pennsylvania
- Lancaster County, Pennsylvania
- Cecil County, Maryland
- Harford County, Maryland

=== West Branch ===
==== Cities ====
- Lock Haven, Pennsylvania
- Williamsport, Pennsylvania

==== Counties ====
- Cambria County, Pennsylvania
- Clearfield County, Pennsylvania
- Centre County, Pennsylvania
- Clinton County, Pennsylvania
- Lycoming County, Pennsylvania
- Union County, Pennsylvania
- Northumberland County, Pennsylvania

== See also ==
- Life On The Upper Susquehanna 1783–1860
