= Sunshine Follows Rain (novel) =

1943 novel by Margit Söderholm

- Swedish edition
- Author: Margit Söderholm
- Language: Swedish
- Genre: Historical
- Publication date: 1943
- Publication place: Sweden
- Media type: Print

Sunshine Follows Rain or Rain Follows the Dew (Swedish: Driver dagg faller regn) is a 1943 Swedish historical novel by Margit Söderholm.

In 1946 it was adapted into a film Sunshine Follows Rain directed by Gustaf Edgren and starring Mai Zetterling and Alf Kjellin.

== Bibliography ==
- Goble, Alan. The Complete Index to Literary Sources in Film. Walter de Gruyter, 1999.
- Gaster, Adrian. The International Authors and Writers Who's Who. International Biographical Centre, 1977.
