= Harry Carman =

American historian (1884–1964)

Dean of Columbia College
- In office 1943–1950
- Preceded by: Herbert Hawkes
- Succeeded by: Lawrence H. Chamberlain

Personal details
- Born: January 22, 1884 Greenfield, New York, U.S.
- Died: December 26, 1964 (aged 80) New York City, New York, U.S.
- Education: Syracuse University (BA); Columbia University (PhD)

Harry Carman (January 22, 1884 – December 26, 1964) was an American historian, professor and Dean of Columbia College from 1943 to 1950. During his tenure as Dean, Carman was a strong supporter of the college within the university, particularly of its Core Curriculum. One of his most notable students was Jacques Barzun.

== Life and career ==
Harry James Carman was born on a farm in Greenfield, New York on January 22, 1884. He attended a one-room district school through the secondary grades and then took over as teacher for several years. Encouraged by a local school official, he passed the entrance exams for Syracuse University and received his bachelor's degree in 1909. After four years of service as principal of Rhinebeck High School, he returned to Syracuse for his master's degree, and, from 1914 to 1917, taught there as instructor and assistant professor of political science.

Harry Carman's connection with Columbia University began in the fall of 1917, when he arrived on Morningside Heights to undertake his work for the doctorate, and, soon afterwards, his duties as an instructor in history at Columbia College. His Ph.D. came in 1919, followed by promotions through the academic grades to a full professorship in 1931. Eight years later, he was named Moore Collegiate Professor. In March 1933, he was appointed to a seat on the Faculty of Political Science.

Regarding his book Lincoln and the Patronage, New York Times writer Theodore Mack, was quoted as saying "the conclusion of the authors at the end of this enlightening and scholarly work does credit to the time and energy that must have gone into it."

He served for twenty-four years on the Board of Higher Education of the City of New York, which was the predecessor of the Board of Trustees of the City University of New York. Carman Hall, a dormitory of Columbia, is named in his honor, as well as Carman Hall, an academic building at Lehman College of The City University of New York.

== Works ==
- Social and Economic History of the United States, 2 volumes (1930–34)
- Lincoln and the Patronage, with Reinhard H Luthin (1943)
- Jesse Buel, Agricultural Reformer (1947)
- Autobiographical essay in Finkelstein, Louis (1948). American Spiritual Autobiographies: Fifteen Self-Portraits. New York: Harper and Brothers. pp. 91–105.
- Preparation for Medical Education in the Liberal Arts College (1953)
- A Short History of New York State with D.M. Ellis, J.A. Frost, and H.C. Syrett (1957)
- A History of the American People with H.C. Syrett (1960)
- Guide to the Principal Sources for American Civilization 1800–1900 in the City of New York, 2 volumes with A.W. Thompson (1960)
- A History of New York State with D.M. Ellis, J.A. Frost, and H.C. Syrett (1967)

Academic offices
Preceded by Herbert Hawkes	Dean of Columbia College; 1943–1950	Succeeded by Lawrence H. Chamberlain
