= A Woman Named Anne =

1967 novel by Henry Cecil

- First edition
- Author: Henry Cecil
- Language: English
- Genre: Comedy
- Publisher: Michael Joseph
- Publication date: 1967
- Publication place: United Kingdom
- Media type: Print

A Woman Named Anne is a 1967 comedy novel by the British writer Henry Cecil. The plot revolves around a divorce case involving a woman accused of adultery, who clashes with the lawyer ranged against her.

In 1969 it was adapted by Cecil into a play of the same title, which ran at the Duke of York's Theatre in London's West End from February to May 1970. The cast included Moira Lister in the title role, William Mervyn, Donald Hewlett and Daphne Anderson.

== Bibliography ==
- Kabatchnik, Amnon. Blood on the Stage, 1950-1975: Milestone Plays of Crime, Mystery, and Detection. Scarecrow Press, 2011.
- Reilly, John M. Twentieth Century Crime & Mystery Writers. Springer, 2015.
