= A Short History of New York State =

1957 history book

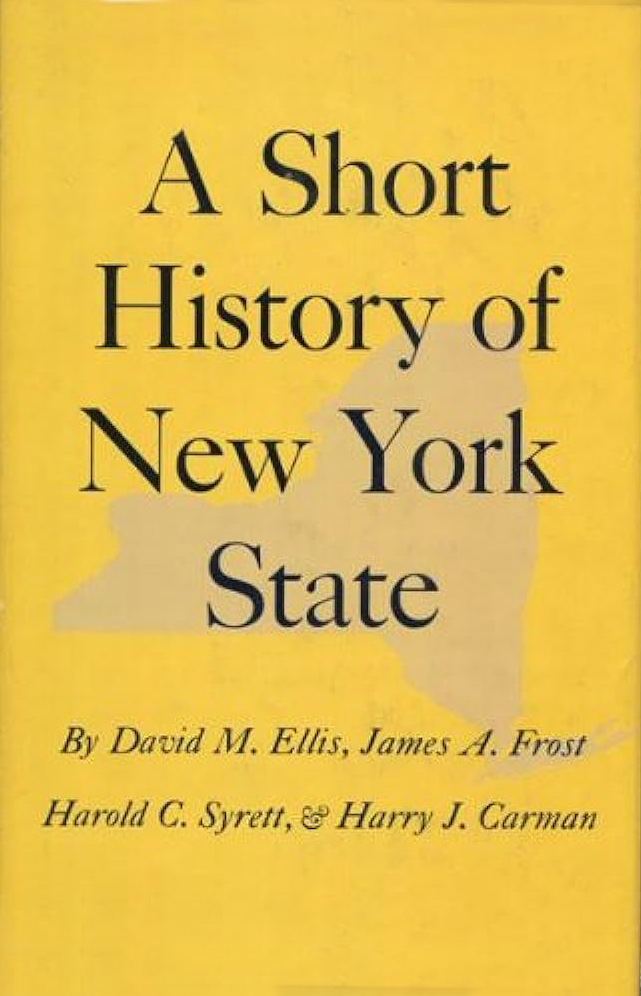
- First edition (English)
- Authors: David M. Ellis; James A. Frost; Harold C. Syrett; Harry J. Carman
- Language: English
- Subject: New York
- Publisher: Cornell University
- Publication date: January 1, 1957
- Publication place: United States
- Pages: 705
- Awards: Dixon Ryan Fox Memorial Award
- OCLC: 1253627

A Short History of New York State is a 1957 history book by David M. Ellis, James A. Frost, Harold C. Syrett, and Harry J. Carman.

A decade after its original publication, a revised edition was printed under the title A History of New York State. The revision was conducted by Ellis, since Carman had died in the interim, and both Frost and Syrett had moved into administrative jobs.
