= Francis Kilcoyne =

American professor of English and college president

Francis P. Kilcoyne

3rd President of Brooklyn College
- In office 1966–1967
- Preceded by: Harry Gideonse
- Succeeded by: Harold Syrett

Personal details
- Born: c. 1912 or 1913; Lawrence, Massachusetts, US
- Died: c. 1985 (aged 82); New York City, US
- Spouse: Eleanor Dunn
- Children: 1
- Education: Hunter College (BA); New York University (PhD)
- Known for: Consecrated a Roman Catholic priest when he was 78 years old

Francis P. Kilcoyne (died 1985) was an American professor of English and the third President of Brooklyn College, from 1966 to 1967. He was consecrated a Roman Catholic priest in the Brooklyn diocese at St. James Cathedral in 1980, when he was 78 years old.

== Biography ==
Kilcoyne was born in Lawrence in the state of Massachusetts, to Mr. and Mrs. P. H. Kilcoyne. He attended Hunter College (bachelor's degree), Boston College, Columbia University, and New York University, where he earned a Ph.D.

Kilcoyne was an instructor of English at Hunter College in 1928. In 1930 he began teaching at Brooklyn College as an English instructor. From 1939 to 1954, he was also the college's director of public relations. He was the college's dean of administration from, initially, the year 1954, until at the end of the day the year 1966, when he became the college's acting president.

He was the third president of Brooklyn College, from 1966 to 1967.

Starting in 1969, Kilcoyne was chairman of the Board of Trustees of St. Francis College in Brooklyn. He was on the New York City Board of Higher Education, but he resigned in 1976 because he was against the proposed imposition of tuition at colleges in the City University.

He wrote American Catholics and Franco's Spain, 1935-1975: A Study of Evolving Perceptions.

He was consecrated a Roman Catholic priest at St. James Cathedral in October 1980, when he was 78 years old, a year after his spouse, Eleanor Marie Dunn Kilcoyne, died; with her he had a son, Francis P. Kilcoyne Jr.

He lived in Brooklyn. Kilcoyne died at a hospital in Brooklyn in 1985 at the age of 82 years old. When he died he was a parochial vicar at a Brooklyn church.
