= Moon Over Hellesta =

- Directed by: Rolf Husberg
- Written by: Rolf Husberg
- Based on: Clouds Over Hellesta by Margit Söderholm
- Produced by: Rune Waldekranz
- Starring: Anita Björk; Birger Malmsten; Doris Svedlund
- Cinematography: Rune Ericson
- Edited by: Eric Nordemar
- Music by: Torbjörn Lundquist
- Production company: Sandrews
- Distributed by: Sandrew-Baumanfilm
- Release date: 24 November 1956
- Running time: 108 minutes
- Country: Sweden
- Language: Swedish

Moon Over Hellesta or Clouds Over Hellesta (Swedish: Moln över Hellesta) is a 1956 Swedish thriller film directed by Rolf Husberg and starring Anita Björk, Birger Malmsten and Doris Svedlund. It is an adaptation of the 1954 novel Clouds Over Hellesta by Margit Söderholm.

It was shot at the Centrumateljéerna Studios in Stockholm. The film's sets were designed by the art director Nils Nilsson. Location shooting took place at the Danbyholm manor house near Katrineholm.

== Synopsis ==
A newly engaged young woman travels to her future husband's country estate Hallesta, but becomes concerned about the manner in which his previous wife died.

== Main cast ==
- Anita Björk as Margareta Snellman
- Birger Malmsten as Carl Anckarberg
- Doris Svedlund as Eva Anckarberg
- Isa Quensel as Emmy Anckarberg
- Olof Sandborg as Gustafsson
- Brita Öberg as Annie Gustafsson
- Dora Söderberg as Agnes
- Sif Ruud as Ulla Forsberg
- Liane Linden as Louise Holmqvist
- Birgitta Andersson as Sonja Elbegaard
- Bengt Eklund as Valter Holmqvist
- Erik 'Bullen' Berglund as Maj. Claes Bång

== Bibliography ==
- Alfred Krawc. International Directory of Cinematographers, Set- and Costume Designers in Film: Denmark, Finland, Norway, Sweden (from the beginnings to 1984). Saur, 1986.
- Per Olov Qvist & Peter von Bagh. Guide to the Cinema of Sweden and Finland. Greenwood Publishing Group, 2000.
