= Sober as a Judge =

1958 novel

- First edition
- Author: Henry Cecil
- Language: English
- Genre: Comedy
- Publisher: Michael Joseph
- Publication date: 1958
- Publication place: United Kingdom
- Media type: Print
- Preceded by: Friends at Court

Sober as a Judge is a 1958 comedy novel by the British writer Henry Cecil. It is the last in a trilogy that began with Brothers in Law.

== Synopsis ==
Now a high court judge, Roger Thursby presides over a series of unusual cases.

== Bibliography ==
- Jacob, Merle & Apple, Hope. To be Continued: An Annotated Guide to Sequels. Greenwood Publishing Group, 2000.
- Reilly, John M. Twentieth Century Crime & Mystery Writers. Springer, 2015.
