= Daughters in Law =

1961 novel

- First edition
- Author: Henry Cecil
- Language: English
- Genre: Comedy
- Publisher: Michael Joseph
- Publication date: 1961
- Publication place: United Kingdom
- Media type: Print

Daughters in Law is a 1961 comedy novel by the British writer Henry Cecil Leon. As with his other works it combines an examination of issues in the legal profession with a general Wodehousian humour.

== Synopsis ==
A judge has two attractive twin daughters who both follow him into the law, one as a solicitor and one as a barrister. As chance would have it they both fall in love with two brothers, the sons of Major Claude Buttonstep. Unfortunately, he despises lawyers throwing a cloud over their potential marriages. Then as luck would have it a dispute with a neighbour means he now needs legal assistance.

== Bibliography ==
- Reilly, John M. Twentieth Century Crime & Mystery Writers. Springer, 2015.
- Sauerberg, Lars Ole . The Legal Thriller from Gardner to Grisham: See you in Court!. Springer, 2016.
