= Sunshine Follows Rain =

- Directed by: Gustaf Edgren
- Written by: Gustaf Edgren; Gardar Sahlberg
- Based on: Sunshine Follows Rain by Margit Söderholm
- Produced by: Harald Molander
- Starring: Mai Zetterling; Alf Kjellin; Sten Lindgren
- Cinematography: Martin Bodin
- Edited by: Tage Holmberg
- Music by: Eskil Eckert-Lundin; Gösta Krön; Bengt Wallerström
- Production companies: Fribergs Filmbyrå; Svensk Filmindustri
- Distributed by: Svensk Filmindustri
- Release date: 26 December 1946
- Running time: 102 minutes
- Country: Sweden
- Language: Swedish

Sunshine Follows Rain (Swedish: Driver dagg faller regn) is a 1946 Swedish historical drama film directed by Gustaf Edgren and starring Mai Zetterling, Alf Kjellin and Sten Lindgren. The film is based on a 1943 novel by Margit Söderholm.

Söderholm's novel won an award in a competition, and director Gustaf Edgren who had been on the jury wished to make a film out of it. However Carl-Anders Dymling the head of Svensk Filmindustri, was unimpressed with the story and proved very resistant to the project. However, the film turned out to be the company's most profitable of the sound era. The film's sets were designed by the art director Arne Åkermark. It was made at the Filmstaden in Stockholm with some location shooting around Hälsingland where the film is set. It premiered at the Palladium in Stockholm. It was later released in Germany and Austria by Constantin Film.

== Synopsis ==
In nineteenth century Sweden, a wealthy farmer's daughter engaged to be married, begins a romance with a penniless folk musician.

== Cast ==
- Mai Zetterling as Marit
- Alf Kjellin as Jon
- Sten Lindgren as Germund
- Hilda Borgström as Kerstin
- Anna Lindahl as Elin, änka på Olsgården
- Eric von Gegerfelt as Eliasfar
- Tyra Fischer as Eliasmor
- Ulf Palme as Mats, deras son
- Hugo Hasslo as Knut
- Inga Landgré as Barbro
- Ivar Hallbäck as Glabo-Kalle
- Göran Ax as Boy
- Torsten Bergström as Vicar
- Carl Ström as Forester
- Einar Söderbäck as Nils, Hand

== Bibliography ==
- Gunnar Iverson, Astrid Soderbergh Widding & Tytti Soila. Nordic National Cinemas. Routledge, 2005.
- Mariah Larsson. A Cinema of Obsession: The Life and Work of Mai Zetterling. University of Wisconsin Pres, 2020.
