= Clouds Over Hellesta =

1954 novel by Margit Söderholm

- Author: Margit Söderholm
- Language: Swedish
- Genre: Thriller
- Publication date: 1954
- Publication place: Sweden
- Media type: Print

Clouds Over Hellesta (Swedish: Moln över Hellesta) is a 1954 Swedish thriller novel by Margit Söderholm. A young woman arrives at her future husband's country estate, and is disturbed by the mysterious death of his first wife.

== Film adaptation ==
In 1956 it was made into the film Moon Over Hellesta directed by Rolf Husberg and starring Anita Björk.

== Bibliography ==
- Goble, Alan. The Complete Index to Literary Sources in Film. Walter de Gruyter, 1999.
- Gaster, Adrian. The International Authors and Writers Who's Who. International Biographical Centre, 1977.
