= Life On The Upper Susquehanna 1783–1860 =

1951 history book by James A. Frost

Life on the Upper Susquehanna, 1783–1860
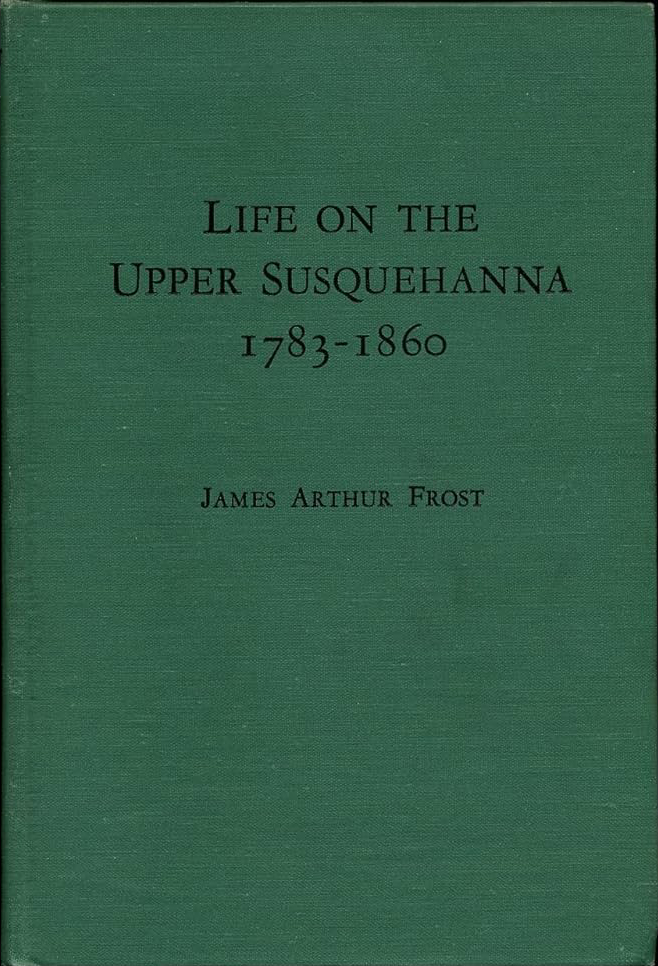
- First edition (English)
- Author: James A. Frost
- Language: English
- Subject: Susquehanna Valley
- Publisher: King's Crown Publishing
- Publication date: 1951
- Publication place: United States
- Pages: 172
- ISBN: 9780231918206
- OCLC: 988185144

Life on the Upper Susquehanna, 1783–1860 is a history book by James A. Frost, an American historian and university administrator, published in 1951.

== See also ==
- Susquehanna Valley
