= Don Rittner =

American historian

Don Rittner is an American historian, archeologist, anthropologist, environmental activist, educator, author and film maker living in the Capital District, Schenectady County, New York. He is the former Schenectady County Historian, responsible for providing guidance and support to municipal historians and serving as a conduit between the State Historian in Albany and the local historians in their counties. He is also the former Schenectady City Historian and was the Albany City Archeologist (1973–79). He is the author of more than 50+ books on history, natural history, computers, and other subjects, and has been collected by libraries worldwide.

== Biography ==
He attended the University of Albany where as a student he continued the earlier work of William B. Efner, a predecessor as County Historian. In 1973 he became the archeologist for the city of Albany. He excavated old Colonial tavern sites and roads, and located the old King's Highway, erecting markers to commemorate the historic route.

During the 1970s, he led the fight to save the Albany Pine Barrens, known as the Pine Bush. He founded the Pine Bush Historic Preservation Project and was responsible for the city of Albany acquiring its first nature preserve, the Albany Pine Bush Preserve. During 1983–89 he served as the preserve's manager. During this time he designed a 40-mile hiking trail around the city of Albany called the Albany Greenbelt. He was responsible for the historic roads and trail system in the preserve to become part of the National Trails System in 1985. In 2008, Rittner wrote a management plan for Schenectady's Woodlawn Pine Bush section in an effort to add more endangered pine barrens for protection.

He has published more than 50 books in history, science, and technology. His book "EcoLinking - Everyone' Guide to Online Environmental Information (Peachpit Press, 1992)" was the first book to show how to use the brand new Internet for a social cause - saving the environment. In 2017, he completely rewrote EcoLinking into a hands on activist manual.

From 1999 to 2005, he wrote a history column for seven years for the Troy Record called "Heritage on the Hudson". Rittner also manages the Capital District Preservation Task Force listserve that provides daily newspaper coverage in history, planning, and preservation to more than 80 leading preservation and environmental groups. He writes a history & culture blog on the Albany Times Union website.

In 2014, Rittner was the producer for the award winning documentary "The Neighborhood That Disappeared," and "Echoes from the Neighborhood That Disappeared." Both appeared on PBS's WMHT. In 2018, he wrote, produced and directed the award winning feature film "Karen or Bust.". He currently is producer/director/cohost of "History on the Road," a TV history adventure series. He is also the executive director of the Warren County Historical Society in upstate New York.

== Books (partial list) ==
Natural history

- EcoLinking: Using the Internet to Save the Planet. New Netherland Press.
- Pine Bush – Albany’s Last Frontier
- EcoLinking : Everyone's Guide to Online Environment Information
- The Zodiac - Dedicated to Science, Literature and the Arts
- Naturalist At Large Environmental Cartoons (with Raoul Vezina)

Human history

- Munsell's Annals of Albany, 1850 Volume One
- Historic Maps Schenectady NY 1614-1795 Volume One
- Historic Maps Albany, N.Y. 1614-1799 Volume One
- Historic Maps Troy & Lansingburgh, NY 1630-1799 Volume One
- Albany History Reader
- Watervliet Historic Images
- Watervliet Historic Maps
- Watervliet Arsenal City
- Watervliet
- Troy (is)
- Historic Maps Lake George, NY 1711-1794
- Albany Through Time
- Serendipity in Science: Twenty Years at Langmuir University. Autobiography of Vincent J. Schaefer. Squarecircle Press.
- History of the Vale. Schenectady’s Historic Cemetery. SquareCircle Press.
- Adrian Block and the Onrust.
- The Legacy of Mount Ida: Troy New York’s Historic Vista.
- Troy Chronicles. Stories of an American City.
- Troy Through Time. Font Hill Media.
- Vanderheyden. The History of the Troy Orphan Asylum 1800-2019.
- Amusing the Masses. History of the Altamont Fair.
- Delivery With Grace. The History of Bellevue Maternity Hospital, 1931-2008.
- America At Night (FontHill Media)
- Troy Revisited
- America at Night (iBook)
- New York at Night (iBook)
- Troy Chronicles (iBook)
- Night in New York's Capital District (iBook)
- Legendary Locals of Troy
- Schenectady: Frontler Village to Colonial City
- Serendipity in Science: Twenty Years at Langmuir University. Autobiography of Vincent J. Schaefer
- Albany Then and Now
- Albany, New York
- Albany Revisited
- Hello Goodbye: Disappearing Landscapes and Artifacts of the Capital District
- Remembering Albany - Heritage on the Hudson
- Lansingburgh
- Troy, New York
- Troy, NY: A Collar City History
- Troy Then & Now
- Troy PBA: 1903-2003
- Remembering Troy - Heritage on the Hudson
- Schenectady's Stockade - New York's First Historic District

Encyclopedias

- Encyclopedia of Chemistry (with R. A. Bailey)
- Encyclopedia of Biology (with Timothy Lee McCabe)
- A to Z of Scientists in Weather and Climate

Children books

- I Can Do It Myself!

Computers

- Macazine Presents the Mac
- The iMAC Book
- Rittner's Field Guide to UseNet
- The iMAC Book: An Insider's Guide to the iMAC's Hot New Features
- iMac, iBook, and G3 Troubleshooting Pocket Reference
- Usenet
- Whole Earth Online Almanac
- MacArcade
- MacArcade - Japanese Version
- Online Astronomy

Scientific Journals

- Skenectada

Magazines

- The MESH - Inside Cyberspace
- Hardcopy for the Common Good
- Skenectada
- Troy (Is)

Films and Documentaries

- The Neighborhood That Disappeared (Producer)
- Echoes from the Neighborhood that Disappeared (Producer)
- History of the Dewitt Clinton Hotel (Writer, Producer, Director)
- Karen or Bust (Writer, Producer, Director)

Television

- History on the Road (writer, producer, director, host)
