= James A. Frost =

American University president

1st President of the Connecticut State University System
- In office December 9, 1983 – October 1, 1985
- Governor: William A. O'Neill
- Preceded by: Position established
- Succeeded by: Dallas K. Beal

Executive Director of the Connecticut State University System
- In office October 2, 1972 – December 8, 1983 (Note: The board of trustees changed the executive director's title to president through CSUS Resolution 85-149. Later, this title was changed to chancellor.)
- Governor: Ella Grasso
- Preceded by: J. Eugene Smith

Personal details
- Born: James Arthur Frost; May 15, 1918 Manchester, England
- Died: March 16, 2017 (aged 98) Simsbury, Connecticut, U.S.
- Spouse: Elsie Mae Lorenz, (m. 1942; died 2003)
- Children: 3
- Parent(s): Harry Arthur Frost; Janet Florence Roberts Frost (née Wilson)
- Education: Columbia University (BA, MA, PhD)

Military service
- Branch/service: United States Air Force
- Years of service: 1941-1964
- Rank: Lieutenant colonel
- Unit: 3rd Air Division; Twenty-Second Air Force
- Battles/wars: World War II
- Writing career
- Genre: Historial
- Notable work: Life On The Upper Susquehanna 1783–1860

James Arthur Frost (May 15, 1918 – March 16, 2017) was an American historian and university administrator who served as the vice-chancellor for the colleges of arts and science at the State University of New York and as president of the Connecticut State University System. He received his B.A., M.A. and Ph.D. degrees from Columbia University. He taught at the University of New York College-Oneonta, and was the author of several books and many articles.

== Early life and education ==
Frost was born on May 15, 1918, in Manchester, England. He was the son of Rev. Harry Arthur Frost and Janet Florence Roberts Wilson Frost.

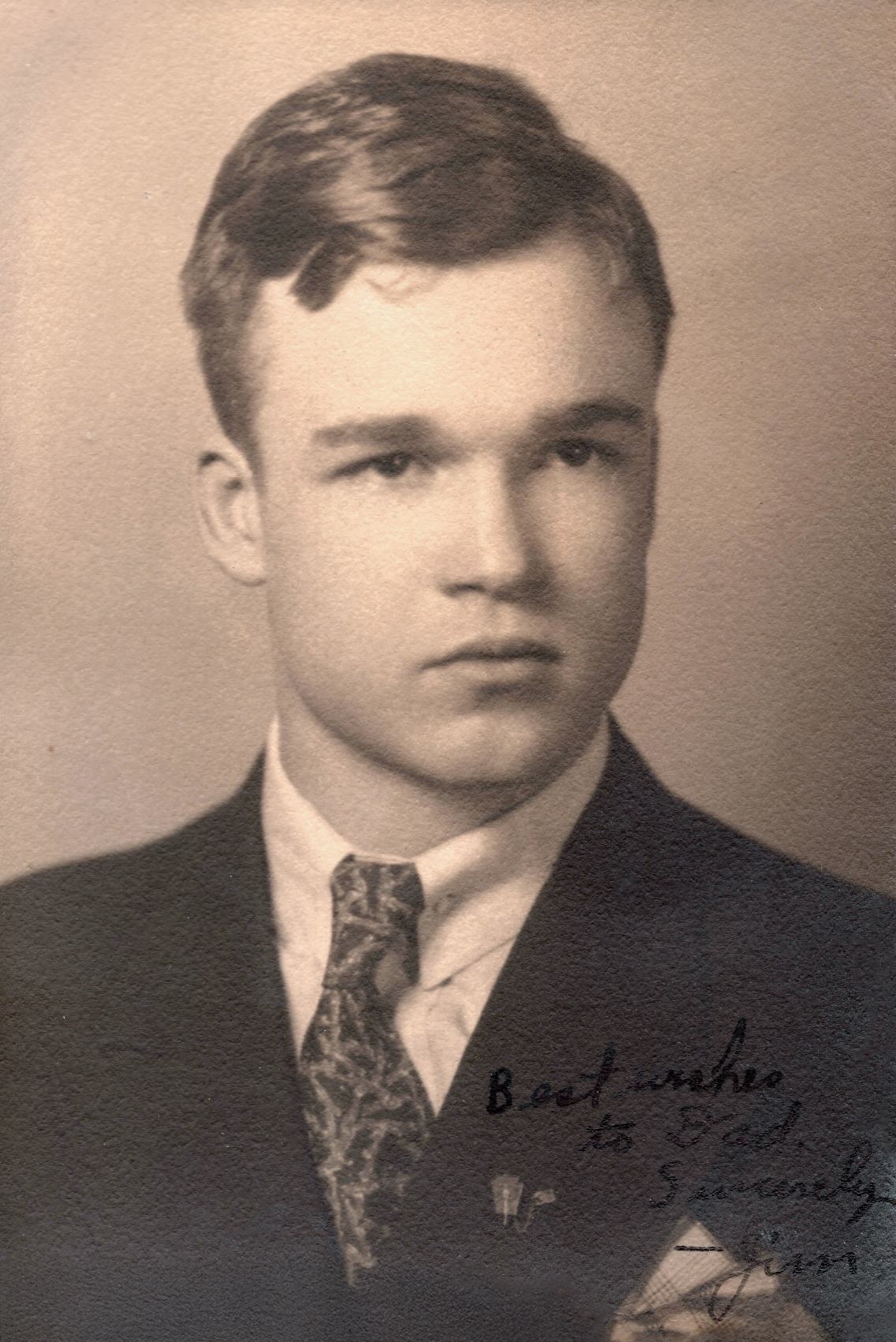
James A. Frost, circa 1937

Frost enrolled at Columbia University, earning his bachelor's degree in 1940. He continued his studies at Columbia Graduate School of Arts and Sciences, where he received his master's and doctoral degrees in American history. In 1993, he was honored with an honorary Doctor of Laws (LL.D.) degree from Southern Connecticut State University.

== New York ==
Frost held administrative positions at the state colleges located in Oneonta and New Paltz, New York. He served as the provost for Academic Planning and Undergraduate Education and vice-chancellor for University Colleges at the State University of New York system.

From 1947 to 1949, Frost taught American history at the State University of New York at Oneonta. He later served as the special assistant to the president. On December 2, 1949, he was appointed dean of the college.

While at Oneonta, Frost was appointed to a Smith-Smudt professorship in American history at the University of Ceylon in Peradeniya, Sri Lanka. He held this position from July 1959 until April 1960. During his sabbatical leave, he received a grant from the Rockefeller Foundation, which allowed him to visit various American studies centers in Japan.

In the summer of 1948, Frost taught American history at Teachers College, Columbia University.

Frost was appointed interim president of the State University of New York at New Paltz after William J. Haggerty retired in late December 1966. Frost made significant personnel changes during this time, and restructured various programs.

Frost was elected an honorary fellow of the New York State Historical Association and appointed to the College Entrance Examination Board's Committee on Research and Development.

== Connecticut ==
Frost led the 33,000-student system for 12 years, significantly expanding academic programs and dormitory growth at Central Connecticut, Eastern Connecticut, Southern Connecticut, and Western Connecticut state universities.

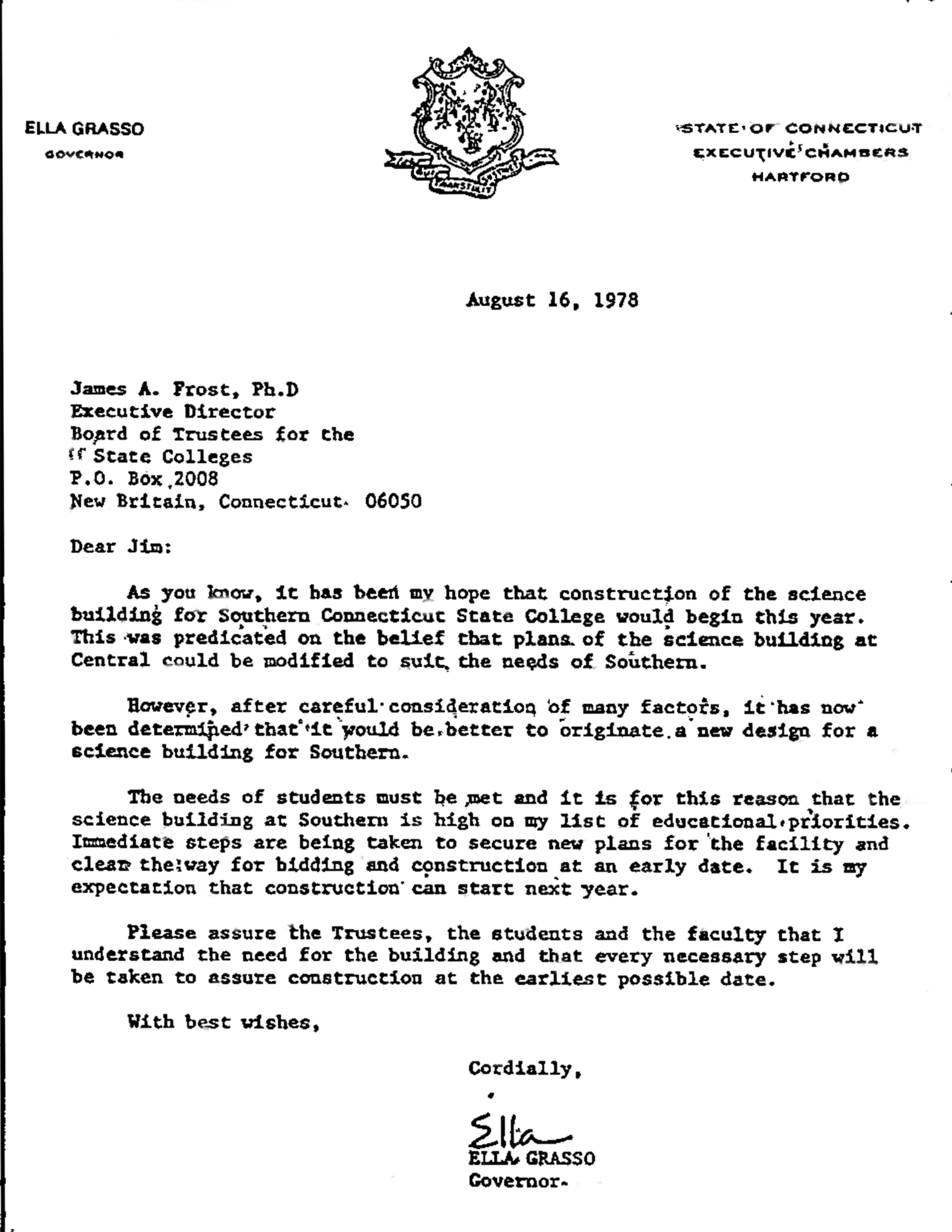
Governor Ella Grasso's Letter of August 16, 1978 concerning science building construction at Southern Connecticut State College

Upon assuming his position, Frost identified that the programs offered across the four campuses were mainly centered on teacher education and liberal arts. Therefore, he oversaw the expansion of the educational initiatives to include courses in business administration, social work, computer science, and health science. Frost played a critical role in transforming the four-year state colleges into a university system, which was implemented on March 1, 1983.

Upon his retirement announcement, Davidson and O'Neill discussed the influence he had had on the state. Later, a scholarship was established in his honor through the Connecticut State Colleges and Universities Foundation.

... Mr. Frost has become a legend in his time for his work in organizing our four campuses into an effective university system that is now the largest in our state. — Lawrence J. Davidson, chairman of the board of trustees

... His integrity in leadership and scholarship has greatly influenced the development of our state universities and the quality of programs they offer our students. — Gov. William A. O'Neill

=== CSCU commencement addresses ===
On January 28, 1973, Frost delivered the commencement address to 157 undergraduate and 164 graduate students at Western Connecticut State University.

In 1984, Frost delivered the 134th commencement address at Central Connecticut State University to an audience of approximately 1800 graduating students.

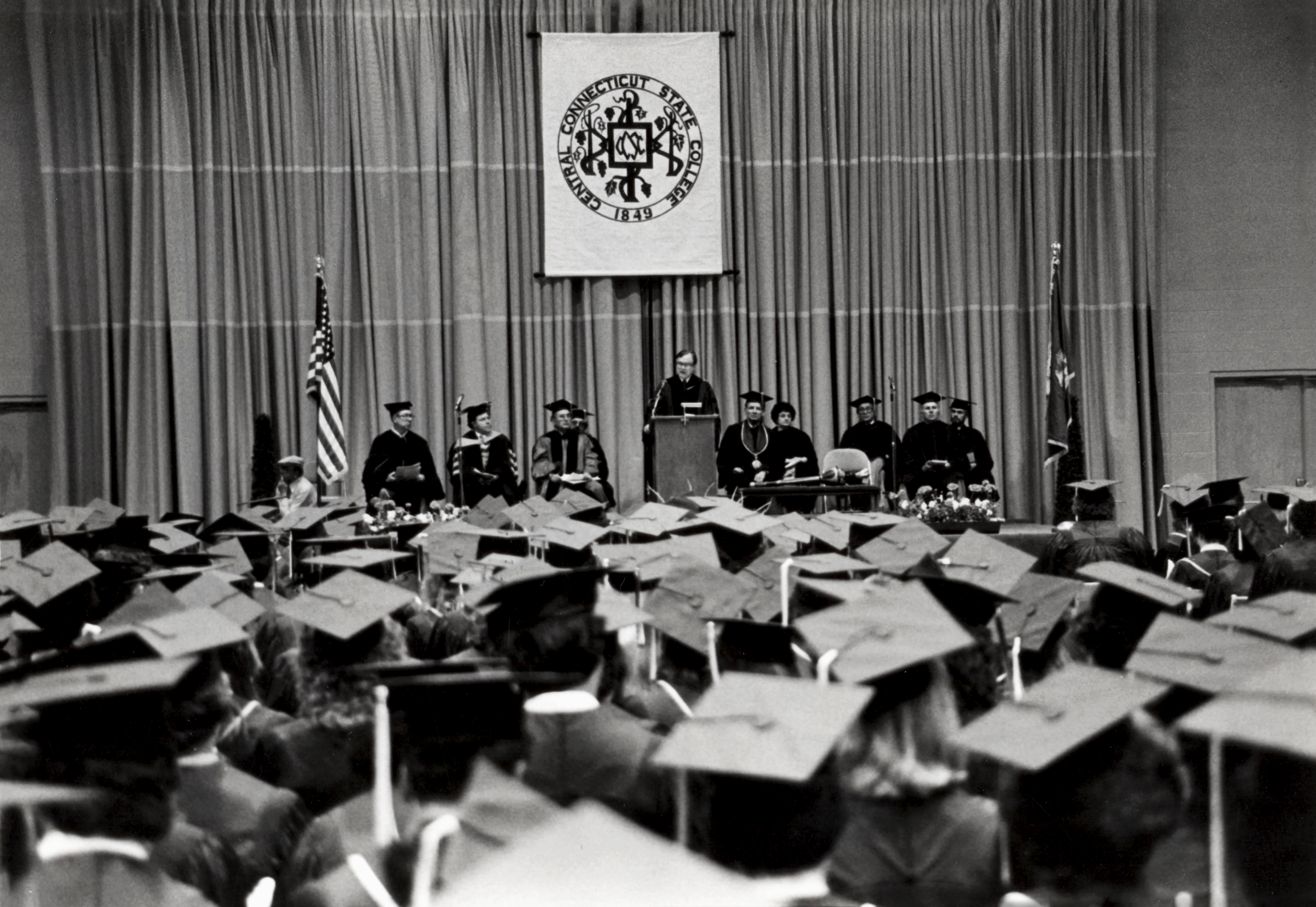
Central Connecticut State University commencement

During his speech, he emphasized:

... The knowledge you have acquired here does not belong to you; you have an obligation to use it for all mankind because we are all the heirs of the past.

=== Robinson School, West Hartford ===
In 1973, Frost, a resident of Simsbury, was appointed to serve on the board of trustees of the Robinson School in West Hartford, Connecticut. He filled the unexpired term previously held by the late Francis Hogan of Torrington Connecticut.

In 1974, Frost delivered the commencement address to the 12th-grade students at Robinson School's 26th graduation ceremony, held at the West Hartford campus. James T. O'Donnell and Theodore M. Smith were class speakers. C. Edward Lamson distributed diplomas.

== Bibliography ==
- The Social Studies in the Public Secondary Schools of Cleveland, 1846-1915, James A. Frost (1941)
- Life On The Upper Susquehanna 1783–1860, James Arthur Frost; published by King's Crown Press (1951)
- A Short History of New York State, David M. Ellis; James Arthur Frost; Harold C. Syrett; Harry J. Carman; published by Cornell University Press (1957)
- A History of New York State, David M. Ellis; James Arthur Frost; Harold C. Syrett; Harry J. Carman; published by Cornell University Press (1967)
- A History of the United States: The Evolution of a Free People, James Arthur Frost; published by Follett (1969)
- New York, the Empire State, David Maldwyn Ellis; James Arthur Frost; William Bertrand Fink; published by Prentice Hall (1979), ISBN 0-136-20419-8
- The Establishment of Connecticut State University, 1965-1985: Notes and Reminiscences; published by The Henry Barnard Foundation (1991)
- The Country Club of Farmington, 1892-1995, James Arthur Frost; published by Country Club of Farmington (1996), ISBN 0-914-65977-4
- Life with Elsie, James A. Frost; published by Briarwood Printing Co. (2006)

== Personal life ==
Frost had at least three children with his wife, Elsie Frost.

== See also ==
- List of Connecticut State University System executives
