= Brothers in Law (novel) =

1955 book by Henry Cecil Leon

- First Edition
- Author: Henry Cecil Leon
- Language: English
- Genre: Comic novel
- Publication date: 1955
- Followed by: Friends at Court

Brothers in Law is a 1955 comic novel by British author Henry Cecil, a county court judge, about Roger Thursby, a young barrister experiencing his first year in chambers. It was followed by two sequels Friends at Court and Sober as a Judge.

== Plot summary ==
At the age of 21, Roger Thursby has just completed his barrister's examinations and has been called to the bar. He commences his pupillage in the chambers of Mr Kendall Grimes, but finds he learns more from Henry, his colleague, and fellow pupils Peter and Charles, to say nothing of Alec, the chambers clerk. Although supposed to 'shadow' Grimes, he finds himself on his feet before a judge within a few days, all at sea on a knotty legal point.

Roger lives with his slightly vague widowed mother, and also balances the affections of two girlfriends, Sally and Joy. Joy obtains his first brief for him from her uncle, a solicitor; an undefended divorce case, which Roger manages to lose, to the lady's fury.

Roger slowly gains more experience and confidence. He is given a 'dock brief', a case of fraud. Despite the odd behaviour of his client, Roger gets him off.

As his period as a pupil comes to its end, Henry leaves to take a position in another set of chambers, and Roger considers joining him.

== Adaptations ==
=== Television and film ===
In 1957 the book was made into a film starring Ian Carmichael and Terry-Thomas, directed by Roy Boulting. Eric Barker won the British Academy of Film and Television Arts Award for Most Promising Newcomer to Film for his role as a barrister's clerk, even though he had appeared in a number of other films, and had a radio career.

In 1962, Frank Muir and Denis Norden adapted the book as a television series featuring an early performance by Richard Briers in the leading role, though Richard Waring wrote five of the thirteen episodes. The series also spawned a spin-off, Mr Justice Duncannon, also written by Cecil.

=== Radio ===
There were also two radio adaptations, one in 1955 starring Donald Sinden, and in 1970 in which Briers reprised the role. The latter radio series by the BBC ran for thirty-nine episodes in three series. They were adaptations by Richard Waring of the TV series. The cast included John Glyn-Jones (Grimes, Roger's pupil master) with Julia Lockwood (Sally) and Bridget Armstrong (Joy) as the women in Roger's life.
