= Natural Causes (novel) =

1953 novel

- First edition
- Author: Henry Cecil
- Language: English
- Genre: Comedy crime
- Publisher: Chapman and Hall
- Publication date: 1953
- Publication place: United Kingdom
- Media type: Print

Natural Causes is a 1953 comedy crime novel by the British writer Henry Cecil. It was his fourth novel. As with most of his work it combines Wodehousian humour with a potentially major crime theme.

== Synopsis ==
After a senior judge rules against the megalomaniac owner of Clarion Newspapers, Alexander Bean, the angry tycoon seeks revenge against him. He recruits a shady figure to try and blackmail the judge. When the blackmailer ends up dead, suspicion falls on the judge as a potential murder.A subplot also sees him having to preside over a libel case over a disputed Test match selection.

== Bibliography ==
- Reilly, John M. Twentieth Century Crime & Mystery Writers. Springer, 2015.
- White, Terry. Justice Denoted: The Legal Thriller in American, British, and Continental Courtroom Literature. Greenwood Publishing Group, 2003.
