= The Painswick Line =

1951 novel

- 1958 Michael Joseph edition
- Author: Henry Cecil
- Language: English
- Genre: Comedy crime
- Publisher: Chapman and Hall
- Publication date: 1951
- Publication place: United Kingdom
- Media type: Print

The Painswick Line is a 1951 comedy crime novel by the British writer Henry Cecil. It was his debut novel and introduced the character of the drunken solicitor Mr. Tewkesbury who recurred in many of his stories.

== Bibliography ==
- Breen, Jon L. Novel Verdicts: A Guide to Courtroom Fiction. Scarecrow Press, 1999.
- Herbert, Rosemary. Whodunit?: A Who's Who in Crime & Mystery Writing. Oxford University Press, 2003.
