= Festival at Farbridge =

Novel by J.B. Priestley

- First edition
- Author: J.B. Priestley
- Language: English
- Genre: Comedy
- Publisher: Heinemann
- Publication date: 1951
- Publication place: United Kingdom
- Media type: Print

Festival at Farbridge is a 1951 comic novel by the British writer J.B. Priestley. A small town in the Midlands decides to hold its own event during the Festival of Britain.

The book was deliberately conceived of and timed as part of the Festival of Britain. It "Memorably describ[es]" the smaller community activities that took place as part of the Festival. The novel was a "flop".
