= Settled Out of Court (play) =

1960 play

- Written by: William Saroyan; Henry Cecil
- Original language: English
- Genre: Comedy thriller
- Setting: A house just outside London, present day

Premiere
- Date premiered: 19 October 1960
- Place premiered: Strand Theatre, London

Settled Out of Court is a 1960 comedy thriller play by William Saroyan and Henry Cecil. It appeared at the Strand Theatre in London's West End with a cast including Nigel Patrick, Maxine Audley, Charles Heslop, Eric Pohlmann, John Stratton, Philip Guard and Mary Hignett. Patrick also directed the work.

Adapted from Cecil's own 1959 novel Settled Out of Court, the whole play takes place in the study of a high court judge Sir George Halliday. Although it received very poor reviews from critics, it was a popular success and ran for nearly a year.

== Bibliography ==
- Amnon Kabatchnik. Blood on the Stage, 1950-1975: Milestone Plays of Crime, Mystery, and Detection. Scarecrow Press, 2011.
