= Meeting in Vienna =

1951 novel by Margit Söderholm

- Author: Margit Söderholm
- Language: Swedish
- Genre: Romance
- Publication date: 1951
- Publication place: Sweden
- Media type: Print

Meeting in Vienna (Swedish: Möte i Wien) is a 1951 Swedish romance novel by Margit Söderholm. A woman returns to post-war Vienna twenty years after she enjoyed a romance with a student there.

== Bibliography ==
- Gaster, Adrian. The International Authors and Writers Who's Who. International Biographical Centre, 1977.
