= Alibi for a Judge =

1960 novel

- First edition
- Author: Henry Cecil
- Language: English
- Genre: Comedy crime
- Publisher: Michael Joseph
- Publication date: 1960
- Publication place: United Kingdom
- Media type: Print

Alibi for a Judge is a 1960 comedy crime novel by the British writer Henry Cecil. After sentencing a man to serve ten years in prison, a worrisome judge becomes concerned that the alibi provided by his wife may in fact be true.

In 1965 it was adapted into a stage play of the same title by Cecil collaborating with two other authors. It appeared in the West End at the Savoy Theatre and ran for more than 300 performances.

== Bibliography ==
- Kabatchnik, Amnon. Blood on the Stage, 1950-1975: Milestone Plays of Crime, Mystery, and Detection. Scarecrow Press, 2011.
- Reilly, John M. Twentieth Century Crime & Mystery Writers. Springer, 2015.
