= Nicholas L. Syrett =

Nicholas L. Syrett is an American historian. He has co-edited the Journal of the History of Sexuality. Syrett is the author of American Child Bride and An Open Secret.
