= Harold Syrett =

American historian (1913–1984)

Harold Coffin Syrett

4th President of Brooklyn College
- In office 1967–1969
- Preceded by: Francis Kilcoyne
- Succeeded by: John Kneller

Personal details
- Born: Harold Coffin Syrett; October 22, 1913 Brooklyn, New York, US
- Died: July 29, 1984 (aged 70) Hudson, New York, US
- Spouse: Patricia Dale McCarthy
- Children: David, John, Matthew
- Education: Wesleyan University (BA); Columbia University (MA, PhD)
- Known for: Executive Editor of The Papers of Alexander Hamilton

Harold Coffin Syrett (October 22, 1913 – July 29, 1984) was an American historian. He served as the executive editor of The Papers of Alexander Hamilton and as the fourth president of Brooklyn College.

== Biography ==
Syrett was born on President Street in Brooklyn, New York, to Frank Harold and Dorothy (Provost) Syrett. He majored in economics at Wesleyan University (B.A., 1935), where he was a catcher on the baseball team, and completed his graduate studies in history at Columbia University (M.A., 1938; Ph.D., 1944).

From 1955 to 1979, Syrett was the executive editor of The Papers of Alexander Hamilton. More than 19,000 documents were published by Columbia University Press in 26 volumes from 1961 to 1979.

He was a professor of American history at Columbia University from 1941 to 1961. Syrett was dean of the faculty at Queens College from 1962 to 1965 (as well as acting president in 1964). He was vice chancellor of the State University of New York system from 1966 to 1967.

Syrett was president of Brooklyn College from 1967 to 1969. He resigned due to ill health. Thereafter, he remained affiliated with the City University of New York as a professor of history at the CUNY Graduate Center, retiring in 1979. During this period, he served as a juror for the Pulitzer Prize for History in the 1968, 1973 and 1979 award cycles, the latter two stints as chair.

Syrett was the author of The City of Brooklyn, 1865–1898: a political history (1944), A Short History of New York State (1957), Interview in Weehawken: the Burr-Hamilton duel, as told in the original documents (1960), American Historical Documents (1962), A History of New York State (1967), and Andrew Jackson: His Contribution to the American Tradition. He co-authored A History of the American People (1952). He also edited The Gentleman and the Tiger (1956), the memoirs of George B. McClellan Jr., the 93rd mayor of New York City and son of the Union Army American Civil War general.

Later in life, he resided in Craryville, New York. Syrett died of hepatitis, the result of a blood transfusion during a hip operation, on July 29, 1984, at Columbia Memorial Hospital in Hudson, New York.

Two of his three sons also became historians: David Syrett, 1939-2004 (Distinguished Professor of History, Queens College, City University of New York) and John, 1942-2005 (Professor of History, Trent University, Peterborough, Ontario). His third son, Matthew, is Librarian Emeritus at Mansfield University. His grandson, Nicholas L. Syrett, is also an historian at the University of Wisconsin-Madison.
