= Henry Cecil Leon =

British writer and judge (1902–1976)

- Born: 19 September 1902; London, England
- Died: 23 May 1976 (aged 73)
- Education: St Paul's School, London
- Alma mater: King's College, Cambridge
- Occupations: Barrister, judge & writer
- Military career
- Allegiance: United Kingdom
- Branch: British Army
- Service years: 1939–1945
- Unit: Queen's Royal Regiment (West Surrey)
- Conflicts: World War II
- Awards: MC

Henry Cecil Leon, MC (19 September 1902 – 23 May 1976), who wrote under the pen-names Henry Cecil and Clifford Maxwell, was British barrister, judge, and a writer of fiction about the British legal system.

== Biography ==
He was born near London in 1902 and was educated at St Paul's School and King's College, Cambridge. He was called to the bar in 1923. During the Second World War, he served in the 1/5th Battalion, Queen's Royal Regiment (West Surrey), and received the Military Cross in 1944. In 1949, he was appointed a county court judge, a position he held until 1967.

He used these experiences as inspiration for his work. His books typically feature educated and genteel fraudsters and blackmailers who lay ludicrously ingenious plots exploiting loopholes in the legal system. There are several recurring characters, such as the drunken solicitor Mr Tewkesbury and the convoluted and exasperating witness Colonel Brain. He writes well about the judicial process, usually through the eyes of a young barrister but sometimes from the viewpoint of the judge; Friends at Court contains a memorable snub from a county court judge to a barrister who is trying to patronise him. Cecil did not believe that judges should be too remote from the public: in Sober as a Judge, a High Court judge, in a case where the ingredients of a martini are of some importance, states drily that he will ignore the convention by which he should inquire "what is a martini?" and instead gives the recipe for the cocktail himself.

His 1955 novel Brothers in Law was made into a film in 1957 and, later, a television and radio series starring Richard Briers. While at Paramount Pictures, Alfred Hitchcock worked on adapting No Bail for the Judge for the screen several times between 1954 and 1960, and hoped to co-star Audrey Hepburn, Laurence Harvey, and John Williams, but the film was never produced.

As Henry Cecil, he appeared as a castaway on the BBC Radio programme Desert Island Discs on 8 July 1972. The programme was not archived by the BBC, but an unofficial tape copy was among a collection of over 90 episodes discovered by an amateur researcher and placed online in 2022.

He also reviewed the Rowland case in the Celebrated Trials series published by David & Charles in 1975. The 1946 trial of Walter Rowland was for the murder of Olive Balchin, who had been found battered to death on a bomb site on Deansgate, Manchester. A hammer had been found near the body, and the police identified Rowland with three witnesses. He protested his innocence from the dock and afterwards. He was found guilty and hanged at Strangeways Prison in 1947. Another man confessed to the killing, but his evidence was ignored when the original judgment was reviewed by the Court of Criminal Appeal. Cecil concludes in his book that Rowland was indeed guilty.

He is buried in St Catherine's Church, Kingsdown, Kent.

== Works ==
=== Novels ===
- The Painswick Line (1951) – Mr Tewkesbury
- No Bail for the Judge (1952) – Colonel Brain
- Ways and Means (1952)
- Natural Causes (1953) – Colonel Brain
- According to the Evidence (1954) – Colonel Brain
- Brothers in Law (1955) – Roger Thursby
- Friends at Court (1956) – Roger Thursby
- Much in Evidence (1957) (US title: The Long Arm) – Mr Tewkesbury
- Sober as a Judge (1958) – Roger Thursby
- Settled Out of Court (1959) – Mr Tewkesbury
- I Married the Girl (1960, as Clifford Maxwell)
- Alibi for a Judge (1960)
- Daughters in Law (1961)
- Unlawful Occasions (1962)
- Independent Witness (1963) – Colonel Brain
- Fathers in Law (1965) (US title: A Child Divided)
- The Asking Price (1966)
- A Woman Named Anne (1967)
- No Fear or Favour (1968) (US title: The Blackmailers)
- Tell You What I'll Do (1969)
- The Buttercup Spell (1971)
- The Wanted Man (1972)
- Truth With Her Boots On (1974)
- Cross Purposes (1976)
- Hunt the Slipper (1977)

=== Short story collections ===
- Full Circle (1948)
- Portrait of a Judge (1964)
- Brief Tales from the Bench (1968)

=== Non-fiction ===
- Brief to Counsel (1958)
- Not Such an Ass (1961)
- Tipping the Scales (1964)
- Know About English Law (1965)
- A Matter of Speculation: the Case of Lord Cochrane (1965)
- The English Judge (1970)
- Just Within the Law (1975) (autobiography)

== See also ==
- List of unproduced Hitchcock projects
