= Dan Hurley (author) =

American journalist and author

Dan Hurley is an American science reporter and 60-Second Novelist. He has written several books and contributed pieces to The New York Times, Wired, The Washington Post, Neurology Today and The Atlantic.

== Early life ==
Hurley attended the Free School of Bergen County and then attended and graduated from Beloit College in Wisconsin where he majored in English.

== Honours ==
Hurley received the American Society of Journalists and Authors' award for investigative journalism in 1995.

== Personal life ==
Hurley was diagnosed with Type 1 diabetes at age 18. He currently resides in New Jersey with his family.

== Works ==
- Smarter: The New Science of Building Brain Power New York : Hudson Street Press (2013) ISBN 978-1594631276 OCLC 849719216
- Diabetes Rising: How a rare disease became a modern pandemic, and what to do about it New York : Kaplan (2011) ISBN 978-1607144588 OCLC 427608826
- Natural Causes: Death, Lies, and Politics in America's Herbal Supplement Industry New York : Broadway Books (2006) ISBN 978-0767920421 OCLC 70122602
- The 60-Second Novelist: What 22,613 People Taught Me About Life Deerfield Beach, Fla. : Health Communications (1999) ISBN 978-1558746923 OCLC 40948515
- Can You Make Yourself Smarter?: New York Times (2012)
