= Margit Söderholm =

Swedish writer (1905–1986)

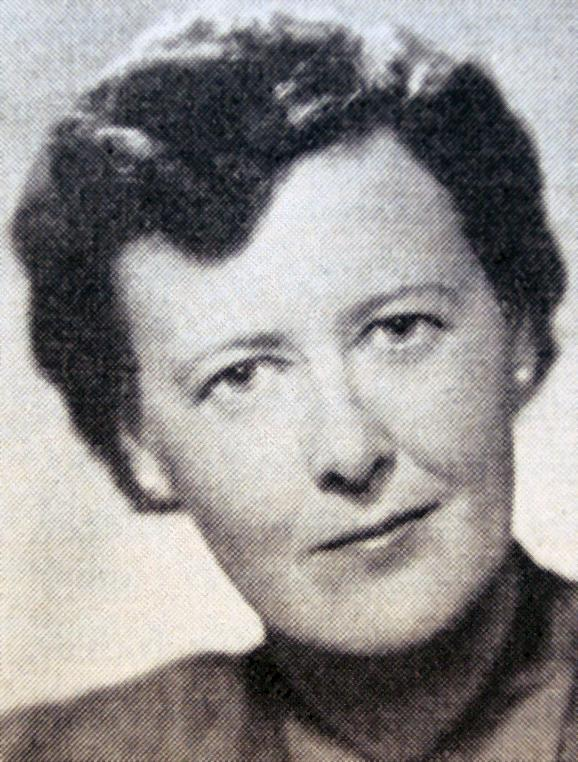
- Born: 17 March 1905; Stockholm, Sweden
- Died: 23 November 1986 (aged 81); Stockholm, Sweden
- Occupation: Writer

Margit Söderholm (1905–1986) was a Swedish writer. Her prize-winning 1943 historical romance novel Sunshine Follows Rain was adapted into a 1946 film of the same title. Her 1954 novel Clouds Over Hellesta was made into a 1956 film.

== Biography ==
Söderholm was the daughter of Robert Söderholm and Aurore Kock. She graduated from Högre lärarinneseminariet and took her philosophical degree in 1935. After working as a subject teacher and lecturer at Bromma kommunale flickskola from 1931 to 1940, she worked as a lecturer at Bromma högre allmänna läroverk from 1940 to 1947 and from 1947 at Nya elementar in Stockholm.

Margit Söderholm made her debut in 1940 with Skolflicksbekymmer. Her breakthrough came in 1943 with Driver dagg, faller regn, with which she won a novel prize competition organized by Hemmets Journal, the book publisher Wahlström & Widstrand and SF Studios. The novel was made into a film in 1946. Her Hellesta Suite, a series of novels set around the fictional estate of Hellesta, was very popular in its time. Most of her books are uncomplicated manor house or village novels where love stories end with marriage in a conventional happy ending.

Söderholm was a member of the pro-Germany Riksföreningen Sverige-Tyskland, and then also of the Swedish Opposition, and Jan Myrdal, who was her pupil at Bromma läroverk, described her as "a great admirer of Hitler". Her political sympathies appear in two of her books: Dit du går (1946) and Möte i Wien (1951).

== Selected works ==
- Sunshine Follows Rain (1943)
- All the World's Delights (1946)
- Meeting in Vienna (1951)
- Clouds Over Hellesta (1953)

== Bibliography ==
- Gunnar Iverson, Astrid Soderbergh Widding & Tytti Soila. Nordic National Cinemas. Routledge, 2005.
