= List of colleges and universities in Georgia (U.S. state) =

University System of Georgia locations

The following is a list of colleges and universities in the U.S. state of Georgia. Many of these schools have multiple campuses. In such cases, only the location of the main campus in Georgia is specified. Most public institutions and traditional private institutions in Georgia are accredited by the Southern Association of Colleges and Schools. The flagship university of the state of Georgia is the University of Georgia.

== Public institutions ==
=== University System of Georgia (USG) ===
The University System of Georgia (USG) is the organizational body that includes 25 public institutions of higher learning in the U.S. state of Georgia. All public schools are partially supported by the state legislature. All students attending public colleges or universities in Georgia are eligible for the HOPE Scholarship providing qualifications are met.

Institution	Main Campus Location	Founded	USG designation	President	Current enrollment (Spring 2026)	Budget (FY 2026)	Campus size as of 2012 (main campus only)
Augusta University (AU)	Augusta	1828	Research University (Medical College)	Russell T. Keen	11,635	$1,081,159,921	485 acres (1.96 km^{2})
Georgia Institute of Technology (Georgia Tech or GT)	Atlanta	1885	Research University	Ángel Cabrera	56,639	$2,323,904,769	400 acres (1.6 km^{2})
Georgia State University (GSU)	Atlanta	1913	Research University	M. Brian Blake	48,765	$1,227,227,541	518 acres (2.10 km^{2})
University of Georgia (UGA)	Athens	1785	Research University, Flagship University	Jere W. Morehead	42,728	$1,951,489,002	759 acres (3.07 km^{2})
Georgia Southern University (GS)	Statesboro	1906	Regional Comprehensive University	Kyle L. Marrero	29,416 (Note: Figure includes the combined enrollments of Georgia Southern University (27,733) and the former East Georgia State College (1,683).)	$552,663,510 (Note: Figure includes the combined budgets of Georgia Southern University ($529,383,363) and the former East Georgia State College ($23,280,147).)	700 acres (2.8 km^{2})
Kennesaw State University (KSU)	Kennesaw	1963	Regional Comprehensive University	Kathy "Kat" Schwaig	48,334	$889,225,103	384 acres (1.55 km^{2})
University of West Georgia (UWG)	Carrollton	1906	Regional Comprehensive University	Michael Johnson	15,270	$274,137,237	645 acres (2.61 km^{2})
Valdosta State University (VSU)	Valdosta	1906	Regional Comprehensive University	Richard Carvajal	9,478	$195,453,204	168 acres (0.68 km^{2})
Albany State University (ASU)	Albany	1903	State University, HBCU	Robert Scott	6,186	$171,471,238	232 acres (0.94 km^{2})
Clayton State University (CSU)	Morrow	1969	State University	Georj Lewis	6,226	$96,453,668	163 acres (0.66 km^{2})
Columbus State University (CSU)	Columbus	1958	State University	Stuart Rayfield	7,152	$140,480,158	132 acres (0.53 km^{2})
Fort Valley State University (FVSU)	Fort Valley	1895	State University, HBCU	Paul Jones	2,886	$146,642,621	630 acres (2.5 km^{2})
Georgia College & State University (GCSU or Georgia College)	Milledgeville	1889	State University	Cathy Cox	6,803	$176,971,673	602 acres (2.44 km^{2})
Georgia Southwestern State University (GSSU)	Americus	1906	State University	Michelle Johnston	3,672	$59,666,208	325 acres (1.32 km^{2})
Middle Georgia State University (MGA)	Macon	1884	State University	Christopher Blake	8,400	$149,973,086	167 acres (0.68 km^{2})
Savannah State University (SSU)	Savannah	1890	State University, HBCU	Jermaine Whirl	2,882	$95,514,521	165 acres (0.67 km^{2})
University of North Georgia (UNG)	Dahlonega	1873	State University	Michael P. Shannon	18,649	$314,023,081	630 acres (2.5 km^{2})
Abraham Baldwin Agricultural College (ABAC)	Tifton	1908	State College	Tracy Brundage	3,627	$63,048,986	516 acres (2.09 km^{2})
Atlanta Metropolitan State College (AMSC)	Atlanta	1974	State College	Ingrid Thompson-Sellers	1,529	$222,837,223	79 acres (0.32 km^{2})
College of Coastal Georgia (CCG)	Brunswick	1961	State College	Johnny L. Evans Jr.	3,348	$51,211,964	193 acres (0.78 km^{2})
Dalton State College (DSC)	Dalton	1963	State College	John M. Fuchko, III	5,038	$67,228,486	146 acres (0.59 km^{2})
Georgia Gwinnett College (GGC)	Lawrenceville	2005	State College	Jann L. Joseph	11,768	$189,507,999	250 acres (1.0 km^{2})
Georgia Highlands College (GHC)	Rome	1970	State College	Mike Hobbs	5,078	$53,599,202	200 acres (0.81 km^{2})
Gordon State College (GSC)	Barnesville	1852	State College	Donald J. Green	3,109	$41,118,528	125 acres (0.51 km^{2})
South Georgia State College (SGSC)	Douglas	1906	State College	Gregory M. Tanner (Interim)	1,808	$29,469,402	190 acres (0.77 km^{2})

=== Technical College System of Georgia (TCSG) ===
The Technical College System of Georgia (TCSG), formerly known as the Department of Technical and Adult Education (DTAE), is the body which supervises the U.S. state of Georgia's 22 technical colleges.

Institution	Main Campus Location	Founded	President	Enrollment (AY 2025)	Additional Locations	Counties Served
Albany Technical College	Albany	1961	Emmett Griswold	4,021	N/A	Baker, Calhoun, Clay, Dougherty, Lee, Randolph, Terrell
Athens Technical College	Athens	1958	Andrea Daniel	5,971	Elberton, Monroe	Clarke, Elbert, Greene, Hart, Madison, Morgan, Oconee, Oglethorpe, Taliaferro, Walton, Wilkes
Atlanta Technical College	Atlanta	1945	Victoria Seals	6,666	N/A	Clayton, Fulton (South and Central)
Augusta Technical College	Augusta	1961	Kendricks Hooker	6,335	Grovetown, Summerville, Thomson, Waynesboro	Burke, Columbia, Lincoln, McDuffie, Richmond
Central Georgia Technical College	Warner Robins	2013 (Note: Lineage dates back to 1962.)	Ivan H. Allen	16,003	Eatonton, Hawkinsville, Gray, Forsyth, Fort Valley, Jeffersonville, Macon, Milledgeville, Roberta	Bibb, Crawford, Dooly, Houston, Jones, Monroe, Peach, Pulaski, Putnam, Twiggs
Chattahoochee Technical College	Marietta	2009 (Note: Lineage dates back to 1963.)	Heather Pence	15,951	Acworth, Austell, Canton, Dallas, Jasper, Woodstock	Bartow, Cherokee, Cobb, Gilmer, Paulding, Pickens
Coastal Pines Technical College	Waycross	2014 (Note: Lineage dates back to 1965.)	Lonnie Roberts	6,065	Alma, Baxley, Brunswick, Hazlehurst, Jesup, Kingsland	Appling, Bacon, Brantley, Camden, Charlton, Clinch, Glynn, Jeff Davis, Long, McIntosh, Pierce, Ware, Wayne
Columbus Technical College	Columbus	1961	Martha Ann Todd	5,049	N/A	Chattahoochee, Harris, Muscogee, Quitman, Stewart, Talbot
Georgia Northwestern Technical College	Rome	2009 (Note: Lineage dates back to 1962.)	Heidi Popham	9,342	Calhoun, Dalton, Ringgold, Rock Spring, Rockmart	Catoosa, Chattooga, Dade, Floyd, Gordon, Murray, Polk, Walker, Whitfield
Georgia Piedmont Technical College	Clarkston	1961	Tavarez Holston	4,609	Conyers, Covington	DeKalb, Newton, Rockdale
Gwinnett Technical College	Lawrenceville	1984	D. Glen Cannon	15,689	Alpharetta	Fulton (North), Gwinnett
Lanier Technical College	Gainesville	1966	Tim McDonald	9,249	Commerce, Cumming, Dawsonville, Winder	Banks, Barrow, Dawson, Forsyth, Hall, Jackson, Lumpkin
North Georgia Technical College	Clarkesville	1944	John Wilkinson	3,643	Blairsville, Toccoa	Fannin, Franklin, Habersham, Rabun, Stephens, Towns, Union, White
Oconee Fall Line Technical College	Sandersville	2011 (Note: Lineage dates back to 1984.)	Erica Harden	3,091	Dublin, Louisville	Bleckley, Dodge, Glascock, Hancock, Jefferson, Laurens, Telfair, Washington, Wheeler, Wilkinson
Ogeechee Technical College	Statesboro	1986	Lori S. Durden	3,210	Hagan, Sylvania	Bulloch, Evans, Screven
Savannah Technical College	Savannah	1929	Ryan Foley	5,801	Hinesville, Rincon	Bryan, Chatham, Effingham, Liberty
South Georgia Technical College	Americus	1948	John Watford	2,632	Cordele	Crisp, Macon, Marion, Schley, Sumter, Taylor, Webster
Southeastern Technical College	Vidalia	2009 (Note: Lineage dates back to 1963.)	Larry Calhoun	2,627	Swainsboro	Candler, Emanuel, Jenkins, Johnson, Montgomery, Tattnall, Toombs, Treutlen
Southern Crescent Technical College	Griffin	2010 (Note: Lineage dates back to 1961.)	Irvin Clark	9,330	Jackson, McDonough, Monticello, Peachtree City, Thomaston	Butts, Fayette, Henry, Jasper, Lamar, Pike, Spalding, Upson
Southern Regional Technical College	Thomasville	2015 (Note: Lineage dates back to 1947.)	Jim Glass	7,443	Ashburn, Bainbridge, Blakely, Cairo, Camilla, Colquitt, Donalsonville, Moultrie, Sylvester, Tifton	Colquitt, Decatur, Early, Grady, Miller, Mitchell, Seminole, Thomas, Tift, Turner, Worth
West Georgia Technical College	Waco	2009 (Note: Lineage dates back to 1966.)	Julie Post	9,896	Carrollton, Douglasville, Franklin, Greenville, LaGrange, Newnan	Carroll, Coweta, Douglas, Haralson, Meriwether, Troup
Wiregrass Georgia Technical College	Valdosta	2010 (Note: Lineage dates back to 1963.)	DeAnnia Clements	6,657	Douglas, Fitzgerald, Sparks	Atkinson, Ben Hill, Berrien, Brooks, Cook, Coffee, Echols, Irwin, Lanier, Lowndes, Wilcox

=== Independent public institutions ===
Any institutes listed here are operated by the state of Georgia but do not fall under the governance of the University System of Georgia or the Technical College System of Georgia.

- Georgia Military College, Milledgeville

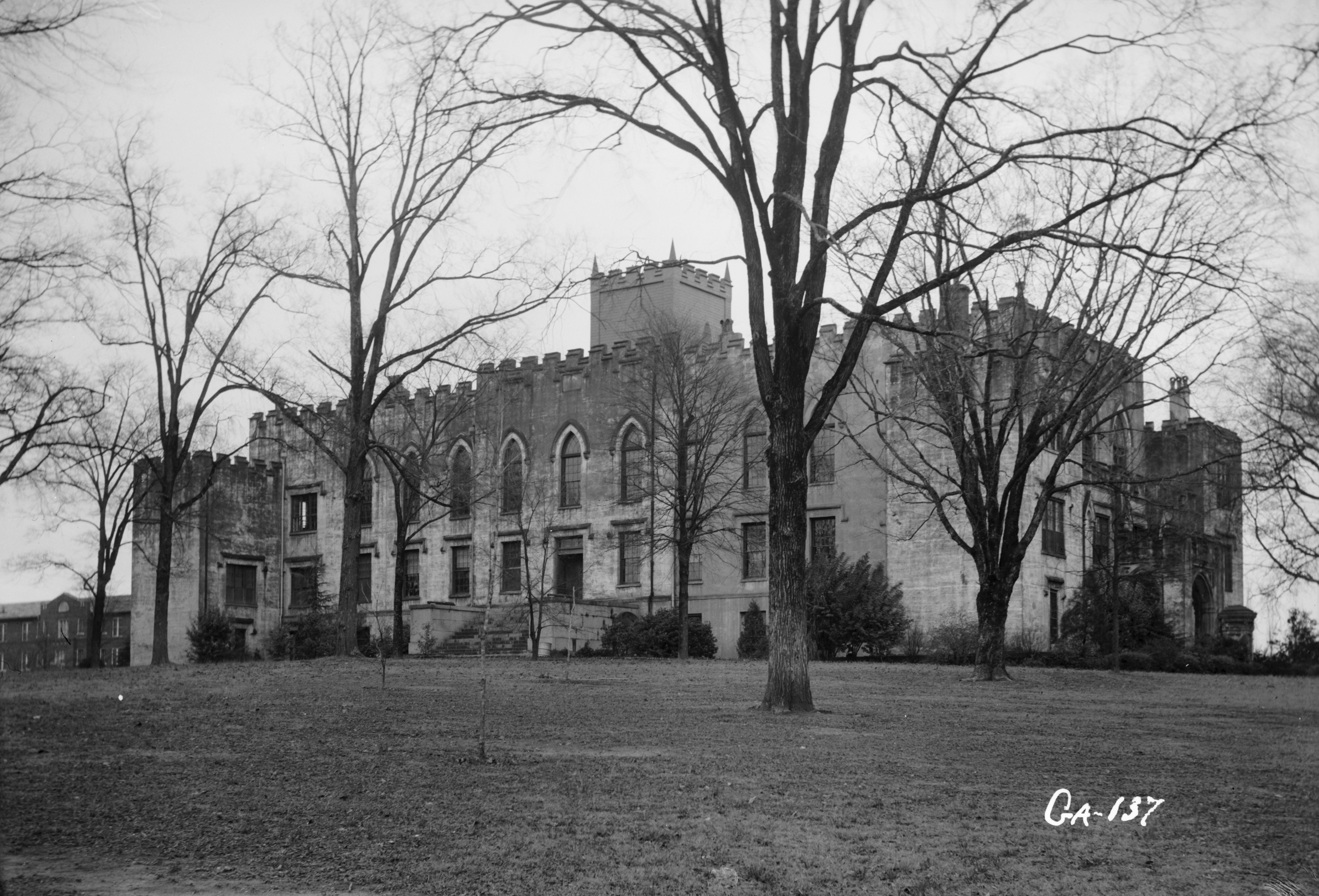
Georgia's second capitol building, 1937. Now part of Georgia Military College.

== Private colleges and universities ==
=== Large and medium-size private colleges and universities ===
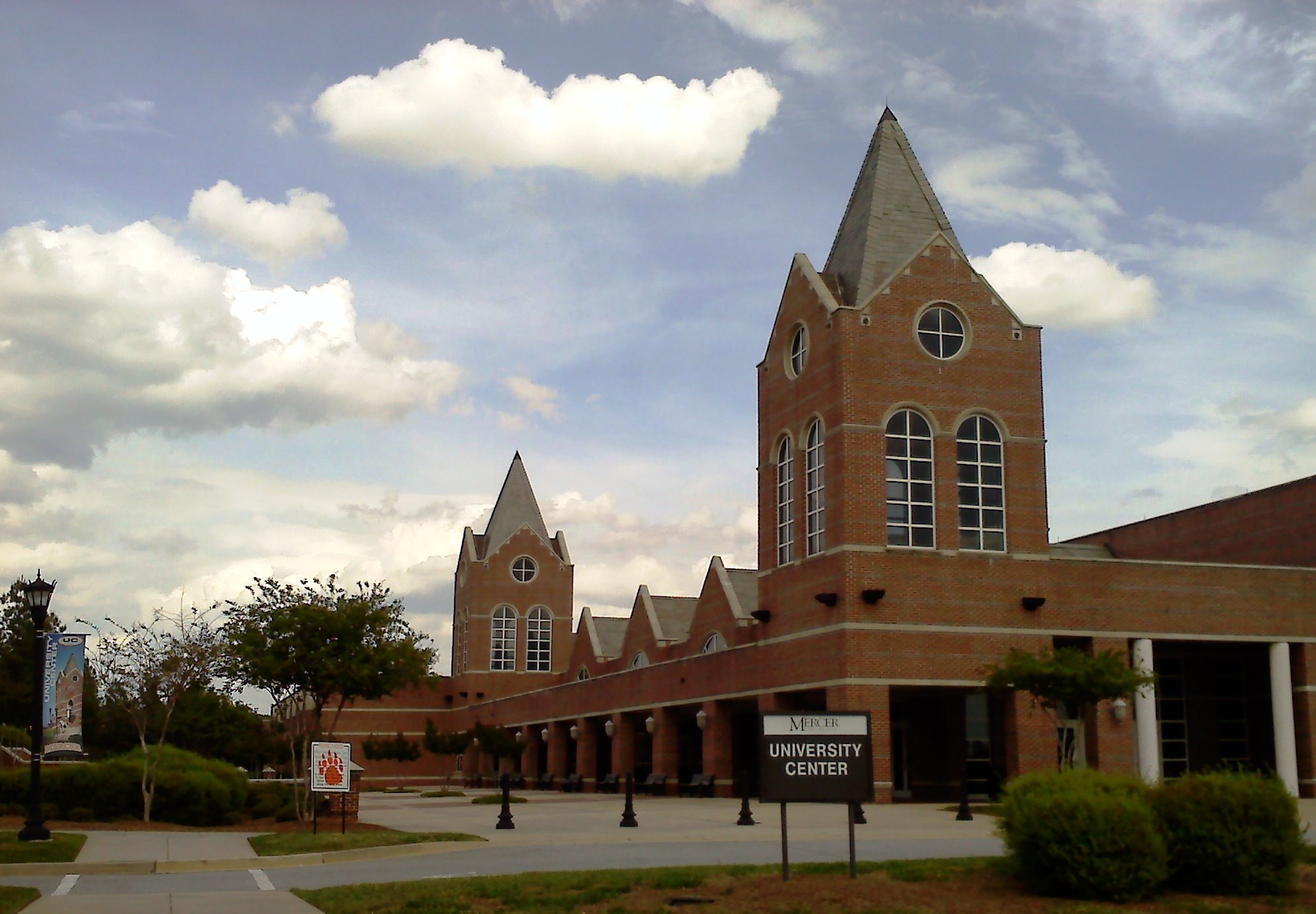
University Center (Hawkins Arena)

Institution	Location	Founded	Enrollment (Fall 2024)	Affiliation	Non-profit status	Carnegie basic classification	Carnegie size classification
Emory University	Atlanta	1836	16,142	United Methodist Church	Yes	Doctoral University: Highest Research Activity	Large
Mercer University	Macon	1833	9,196	None	Yes	Doctoral University: Moderate Research Activity	Medium
Savannah College of Art and Design	Savannah	1978	18,550	None	Yes	Special Focus Four-Year: Arts, Music & Design	Medium
South University	Savannah	1899	716 8,803 in online program	None	No	Master's University: Larger Program	Large

=== Small non-profit private colleges and universities ===
==== Atlanta University Center ====
The Atlanta University Center is a consortium of historically black private colleges located on neighboring campuses near downtown Atlanta. Though each school is administered independently, students are offered a unified learning experience through cross-registration of courses. Current members are listed below.

- Clark Atlanta University
- Morehouse College – Men's college
- Morehouse School of Medicine
- Spelman College – Women's college

==== Liberal arts ====
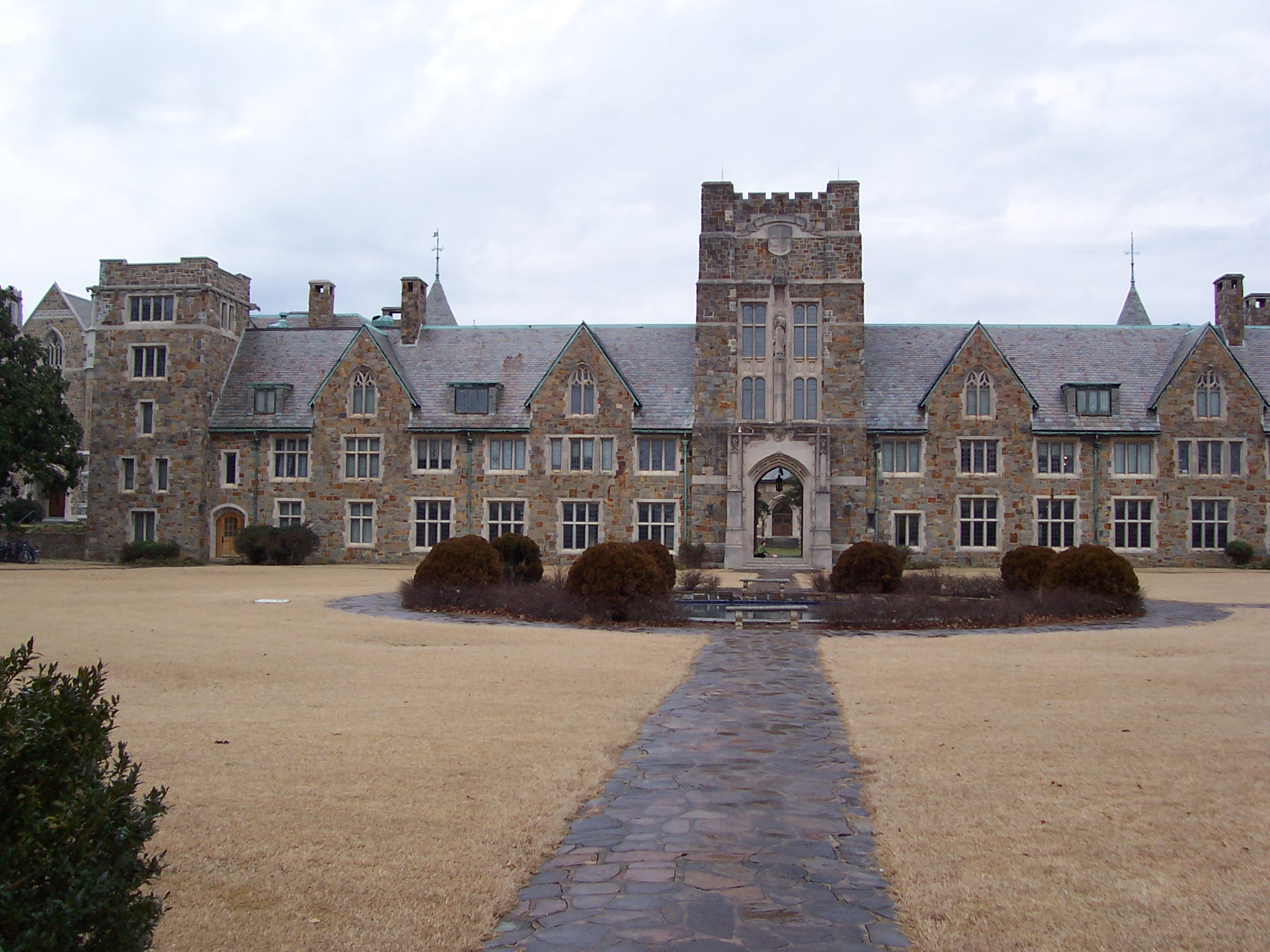
Mary Hall at Berry College

- Agnes Scott College, Decatur – women's college – affiliated with Presbyterian Church (USA)
- Berry College, Mount Berry – Christian school
- Brewton–Parker Christian University, Mount Vernon – affiliated with Georgia Baptist Convention
- College of Athens, Watkinsville
- Covenant College, Lookout Mountain – Christian school – affiliated with Presbyterian Church in America
- Emmanuel University, Franklin Springs – affiliated with International Pentecostal Holiness Church
- Holy Spirit College, Atlanta
- Morris Brown College, Atlanta
- Oglethorpe University, Brookhaven
- Piedmont University, Demorest – affiliated with the National Association of Congregational Christian Churches and the United Church of Christ
- Reinhardt University, Waleska – affiliated with United Methodist Church
- Shorter University, Rome – affiliated with Georgia Baptist Convention
- Wesleyan College, Macon – women's college – affiliated with United Methodist Church
- Young Harris College, Young Harris – affiliated with United Methodist Church

==== Others ====
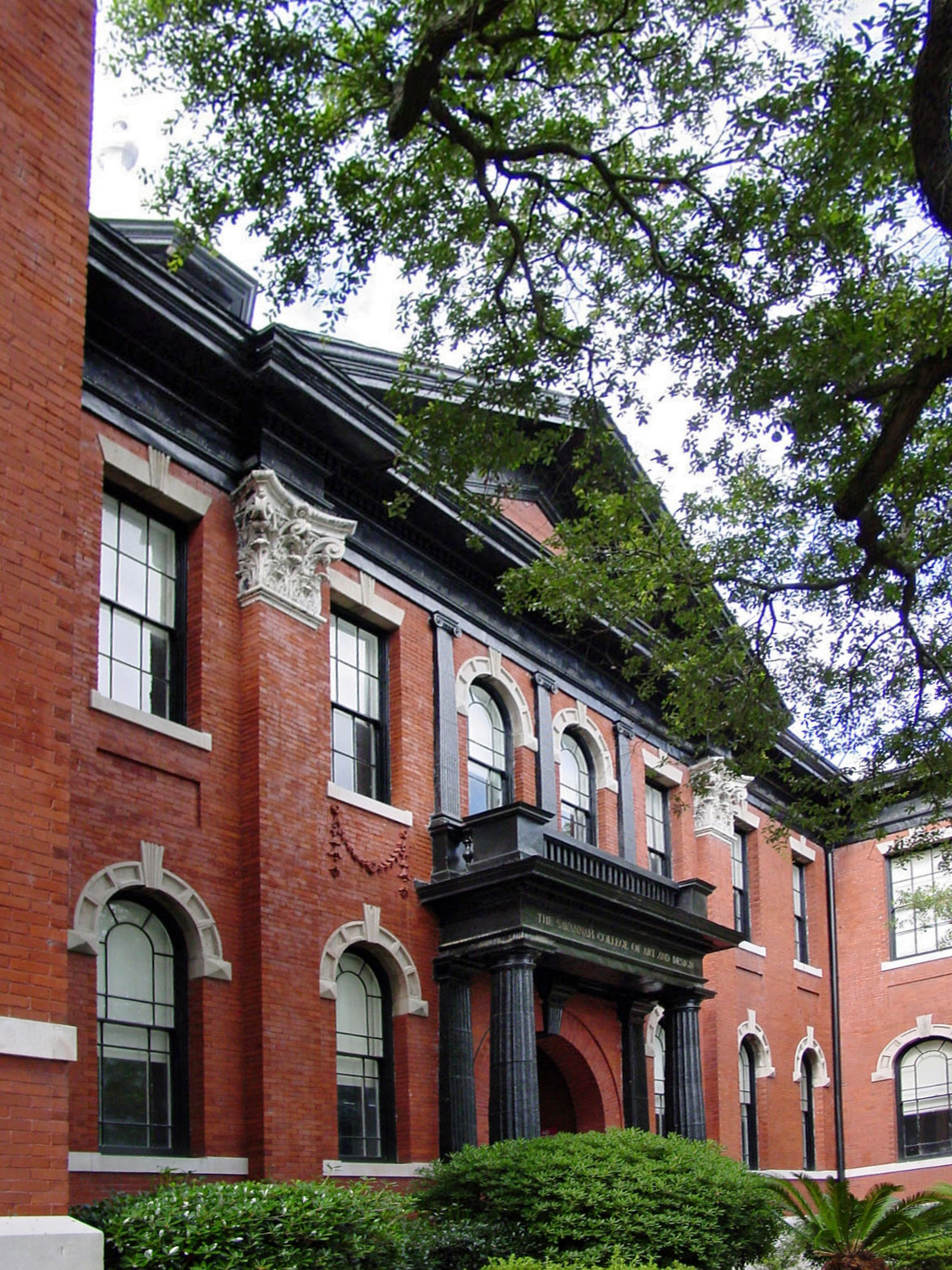
Anderson Hall at Savannah College of Art and Design

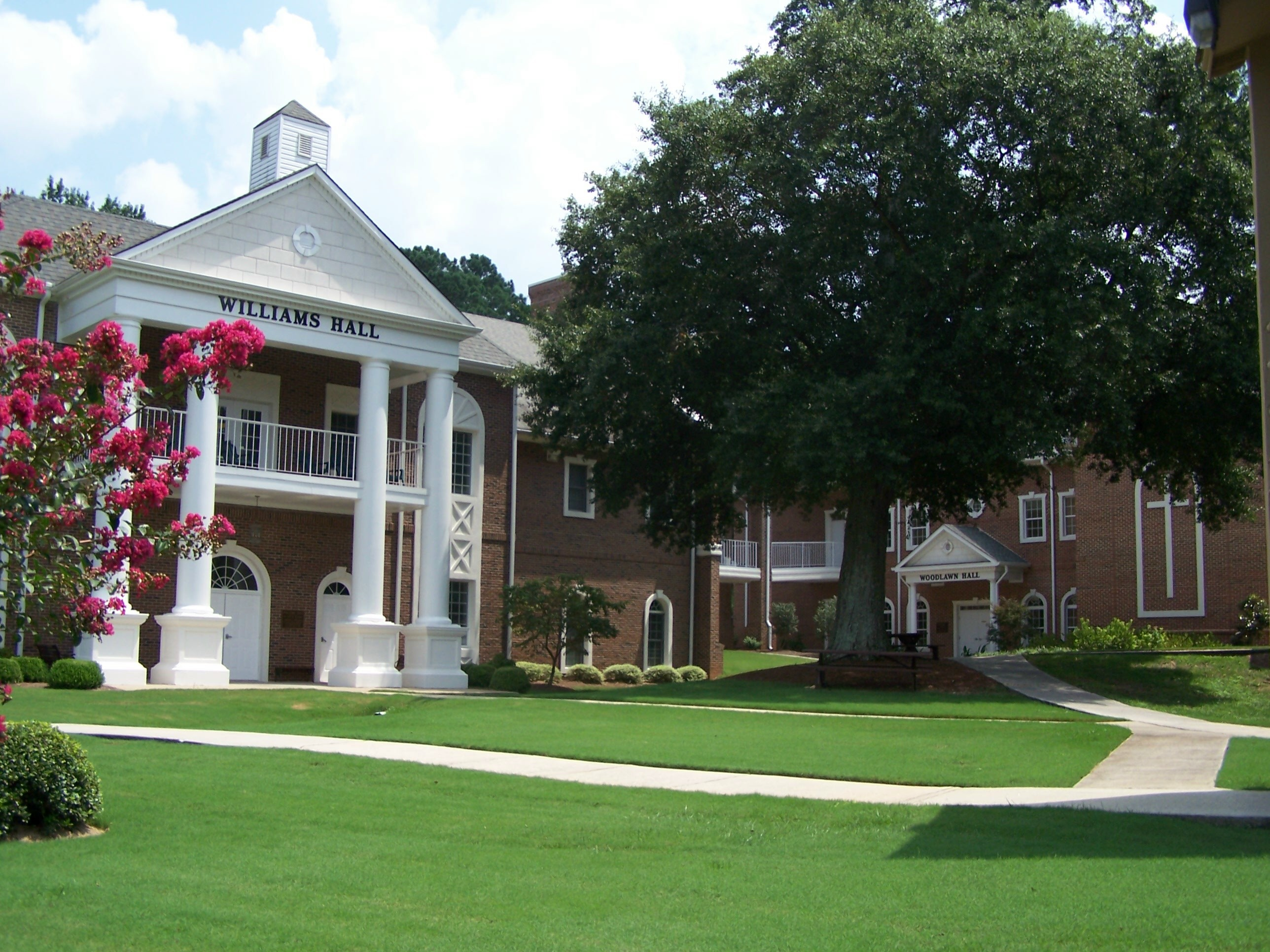
Williams Hall at Luther Rice College & Seminary

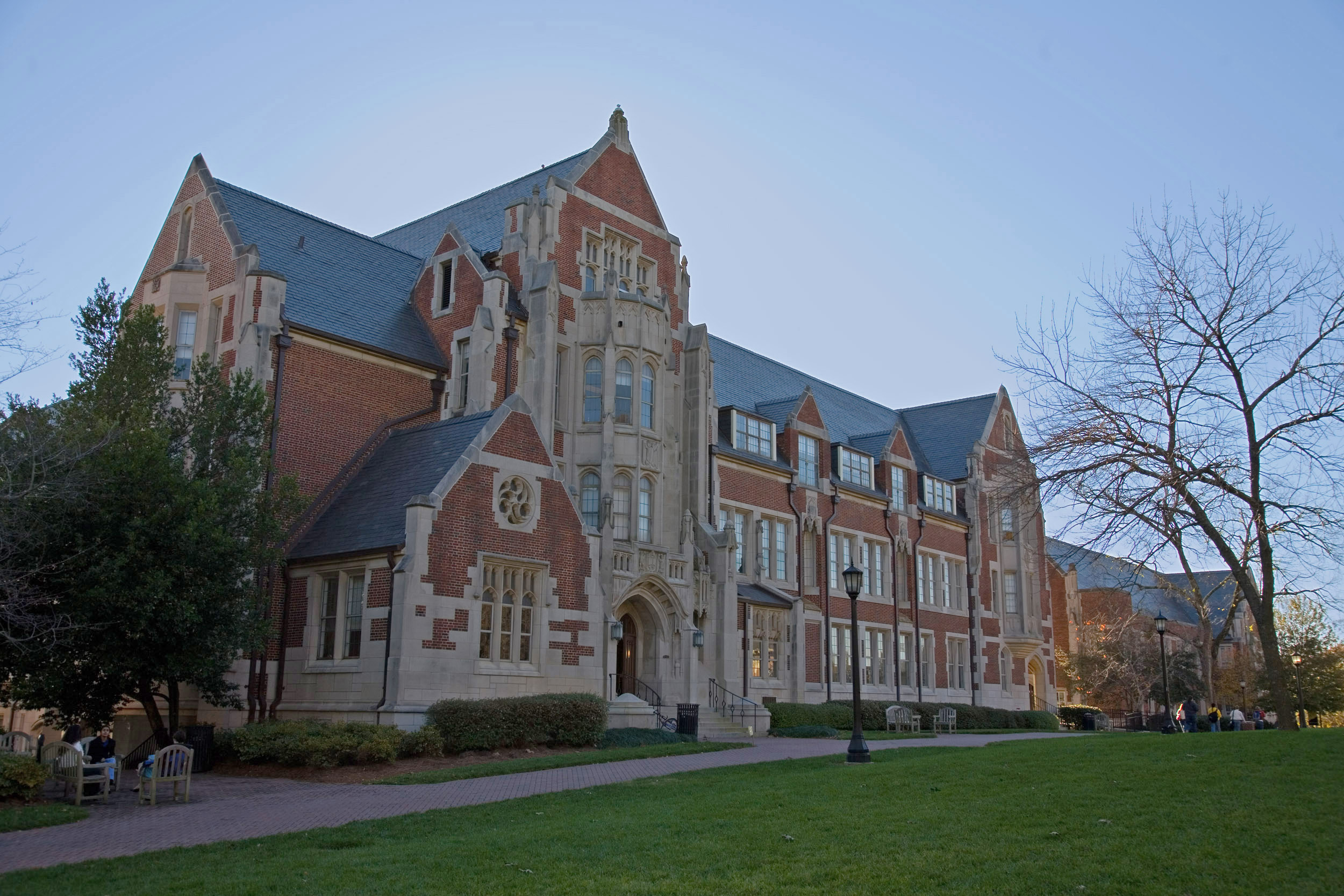
Buttrick Hall at Agnes Scott College

- American InterContinental University, Atlanta
- Andersonville Theological Seminary, Camilla
- Andrew College, Cuthbert – affiliated with United Methodist Church
- Atlanta's John Marshall Law School, Atlanta
- Brenau University, Gainesville
- Chamberlain University, Sandy Springs
- Christian College of Georgia, Atlanta – affiliated with Christian Church (Disciples of Christ)
- Columbia College of Missouri, Fort Stewart and Hunter Army Airfield
- Columbia Theological Seminary, Decatur – affiliated with Presbyterian Church (USA)
- DeVry University, Decatur
- Evangeline Booth College, Atlanta – theological school affiliated with The Salvation Army
- Georgia Central University, Atlanta – Christian school affiliated with Korean American Presbyterian Church
- Gupton Jones College of Funeral Service, Decatur
- Helms College, Augusta
- Herzing University, Atlanta
- Interdenominational Theological Center, Atlanta
- LaGrange College, LaGrange
- Life University, Marietta
- Luther Rice College & Seminary, Lithonia
- Paine College, Augusta – historically black school
- Philadelphia College of Osteopathic Medicine (Georgia Campus), Suwanee – pharmacy school
- Point University, West Point – affiliated with Christian churches and churches of Christ
- Strayer University, Chamblee
- Thomas University, Thomasville
- Toccoa Falls College, Toccoa – affiliated with Christian and Missionary Alliance
- Truett McConnell University, Cleveland – affiliated with Georgia Baptist Convention

=== Small for-profit schools ===
For-profit institutions are those that are operated by private, profit-seeking businesses.

- Ashworth College, Norcross
- Atlanta Institute of Music and Media, Duluth
- Aviation Institute of Maintenance, Duluth
- Beulah Heights University, Atlanta
- Fortis College, Smyrna
- Gwinnett College, Lilburn, Marietta, and Sandy Springs
- Interactive College of Technology, Chamblee, Gainesville, and Morrow
- Lincoln Tech, East Point and Marietta
- Miller-Motte College, Augusta, Columbus, and Macon

== Academics and reputation ==
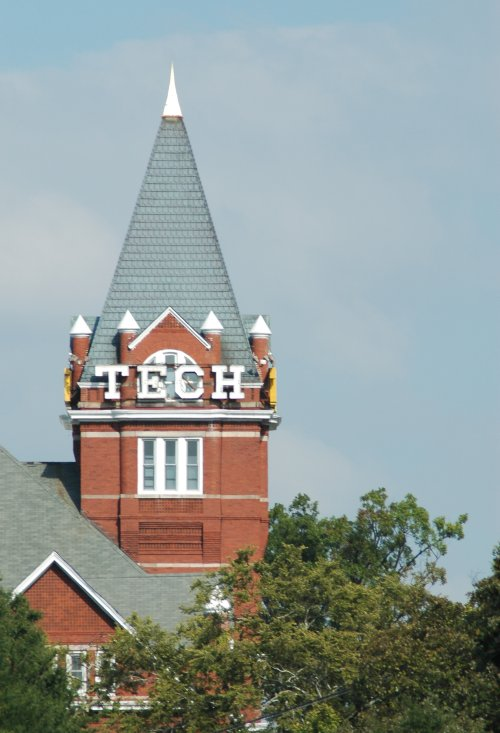
Georgia Tech's Tech Tower

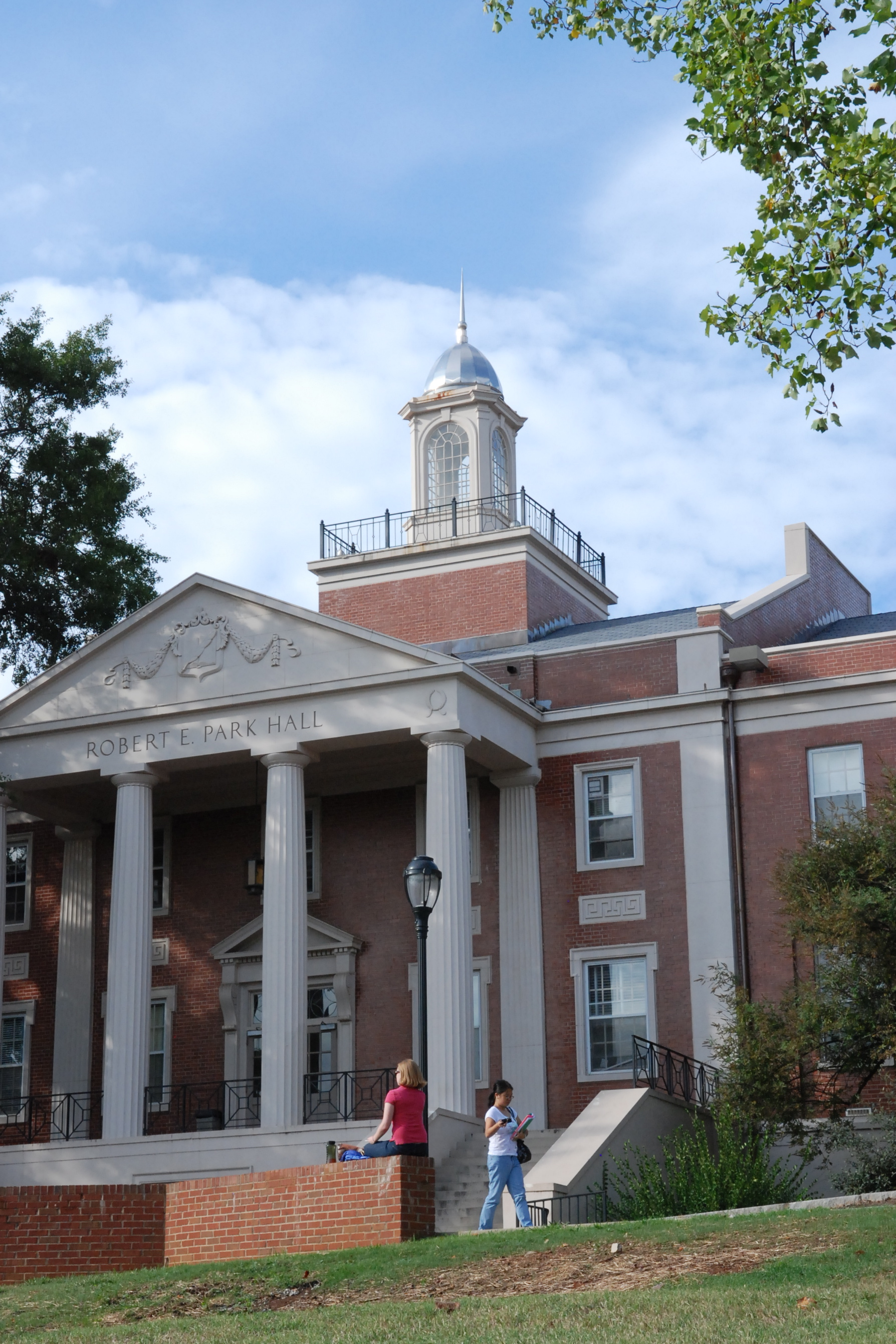
Park Hall, one of the oldest buildings on campus at the University of Georgia

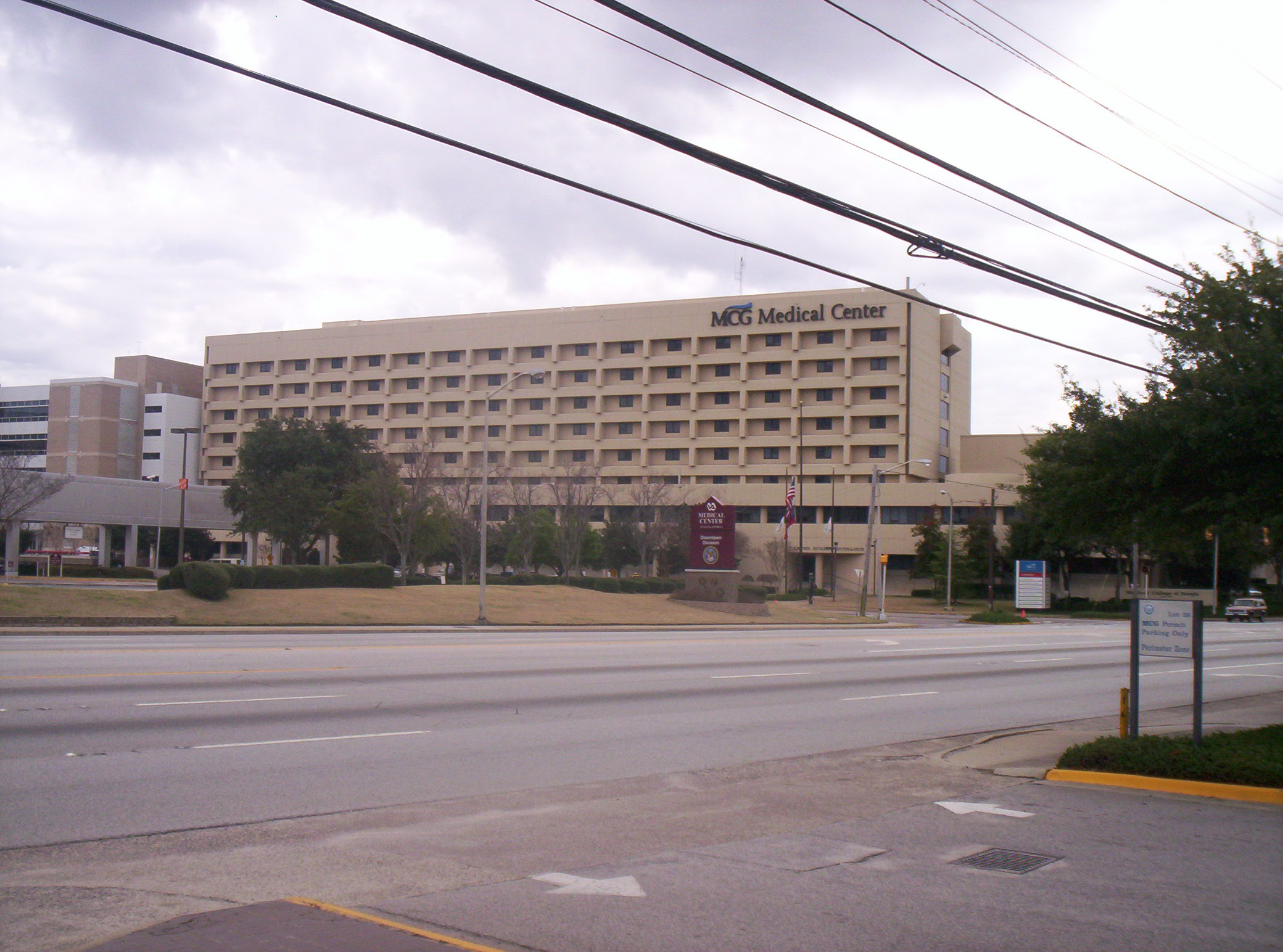
Georgia Regents Medical Center, academic medical center at Augusta University

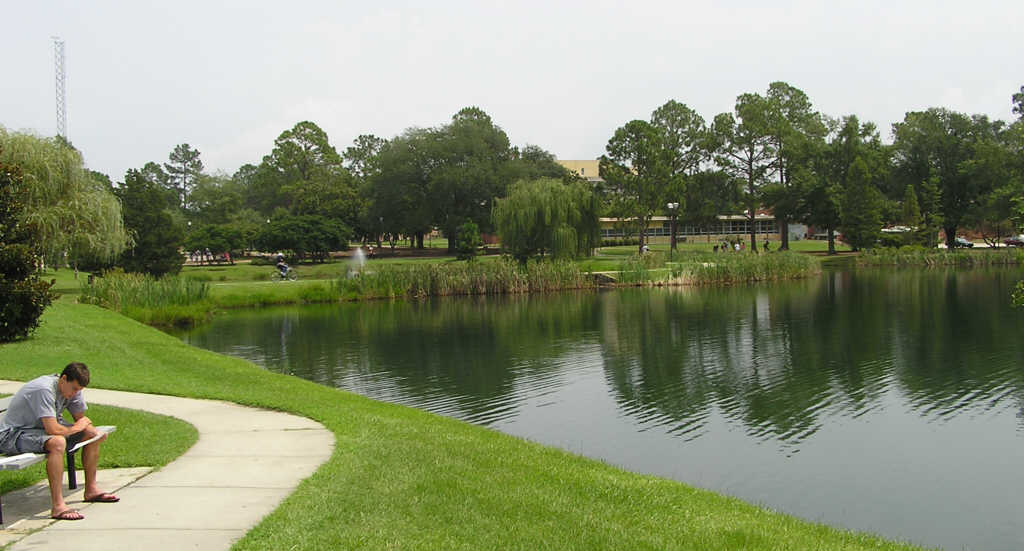
Lake Wells and Ruby at Georgia Southern University.

=== Public and private schools ranked by academic measures ===
The institutions below are ranked by average SAT score of first-time freshman for the 2012-2013 academic year. A first-time freshman describes a student entering a 4-year college or university for the first time. First-time freshman account for the majority of the student population at a 4-year college or university. These figures do not include transfer, dual enrolled, post-baccalaureate or non-traditional students.

(NOTE: The reported values for public schools are as reported by the USG's annual report, minor variations may exist when comparing to other college search publications such as College Board)

Institution	Type	Average SAT(CR+Math) score of entering freshmen(2012)	Average GPA of entering freshmen(2012)	6-year graduation rates(2006-2012)	First-time freshman retention rate (2012)
Georgia Institute of Technology	Public	1385^{e}	3.86^{c}	82%	96%
Emory University	Private	1365^{e}	3.88	90%	94%
University of Georgia	Public	1240^{e}	3.76^{d}	83%	94%
Georgia College & State University	Public	1172	3.42	75.46%	85%
Mercer University	Private	1170^{e}	3.56	64%	82%
Berry College	Private	1160	3.56	61%	75%
Agnes Scott College	Private	1160^{e}	3.88	64%	82%
University of North Georgia	Public	1117	3.51	63.08%	78%
Georgia Southern University	Public	1115	3.18	60.51%	77%
Oglethorpe University	Private	1113^{e}	3.4	56%	80%
4-year institution USG average	Public(all USG schools are public schools)	1110	3.12		74%
Kennesaw State University ^{f}	Public	1089	3.20	51.47%	76%
Georgia State University	Public	1082	3.33	57.77%	83%
Morehouse College	Private	1025	3.24	55%	82%
Spelman College	Private	1020	3.63	72%	90%
Georgia Southern University-Armstrong Campus	Public	1016	3.16	40.86%	69%
Valdosta State University	Public	1015	3.12	52.32%	67%
National average		1010		58%	77.1%
Columbus State University	Public	987	3.10	41.35%	67%
Georgia Southwestern State University	Public	987	3.23	39.85%	63%
University of West Georgia	Public	965	3.08	46.40%	70
Clayton State University	Public	947	3.22	36.96%	66%
Albany State University	Public	890	2.92	46.01%	65%
Clark Atlanta University	Private	880	3.0	39%	61%
Savannah State University	Public	867	2.74	38.02%	72%
Fort Valley State University	Public	844	2.76	33.82%	60%
Paine College	Private	775	2.64	Not reported	52%

- ^cThe average number of AP/IB/Dual Enrollment courses taken by a 2014 accepted freshman at Georgia Tech was 8.5
- ^dThe average number of AP/IB/Dual Enrollment courses taken by a 2042 accepted freshman at University of Georgia was 7
- ^e SAT Subject tests are considered at this institution.
- ^f Statistics do not include students that enrolled at Southern Polytechnic State University prior to those institutions' merger.

== Academic achievement among Georgia colleges and universities ==
=== Rank by Rhodes Scholars ===
59 Rhodes Scholars came from a Georgia college or university. The most Rhodes Scholars came from the University of Georgia and Emory University.

Rank	Institution	Number of Rhodes Scholars
1	University of Georgia	27
2	Emory University	19
3	Georgia Institute of Technology	6
4	Morehouse College	3
5	Mercer University	2
6	Agnes Scott College	1
7	Berry College	1

=== Rank by Marshall Scholars ===
The University of Georgia and Georgia Institute of Technology rank among top 10 public universities receiving Marshall scholars. Since 2001, Georgia Tech students have received 8 Marshall Scholarships and UGA has received 5 ranking 2nd and 6th respectively for most Marshall Scholars among public universities.

Institution	Number of Marshall Scholars
Georgia Institute of Technology	8
Emory University	6
University of Georgia	5
Agnes Scott College	1

=== Rank by Fulbright scholars ===
In 2012, University of Georgia and Emory University ranked in the top percentile of doctoral/research institutions producing Fulbright scholars. 38 Fulbright scholars came from Georgian institutions. The Fulbright Program is a program of highly competitive, merit-based grants for international educational exchange for students, scholars, teachers, professionals, scientists and artists, founded by United States Senator J. William Fulbright in 1946.

Rank	Institution	Number of Fulbright scholars (2012–2013)
1	University of Georgia	13
2	Emory University	11
3	Spelman College	5
4	Agnes Scott College	4
5	Georgia Institute of Technology	2
6	Mercer University	2
7	Georgia College & State University	1

=== Rank by Truman Scholars ===
Since the scholarship was enacted in 1977, 49 Truman Scholars came from a Georgian college or University. The Harry S. Truman Scholarship is a competitive and prestigious federal scholarship granted to U.S. college juniors for demonstrated leadership potential and a commitment to public service.

Rank	Institution	Number of Truman Scholars
1	University of Georgia	17
2	Emory University	9
3	Georgia Institute of Technology	7
4	Spelman College	7
5	Agnes Scott College	5
6	Mercer University	1
7	Morehouse College	1
8	University of West Georgia	1

== Athletic affiliations of 4-year institutions ==
Institution	Type	Mascot	Athletic Affiliation	Conference
Georgia Tech	Public	Yellow Jackets	NCAA Division I (FBS)	Atlantic Coast Conference
Georgia	Public	Bulldogs	NCAA Division I (FBS)	Southeastern Conference
Georgia Southern	Public	Eagles	NCAA Division I (FBS)	Sun Belt Conference
Georgia State	Public	Panthers	NCAA Division I (FBS)	Sun Belt Conference
Kennesaw State	Public	Owls	NCAA Division I (FBS)	Conference USA
Mercer	Private	Bears	NCAA Division I (FCS)	Southern Conference
West Georgia	Public	Wolves	NCAA Division I (FCS)	Atlantic Sun Conference
Valdosta State	Public	Blazers	NCAA Division II	Gulf South Conference
Shorter	Private	Hawks	NCAA Division II	Gulf South Conference
Augusta	Public	Jaguars	NCAA Division II ^{h}	Peach Belt Conference
Clayton State	Public	Lakers	NCAA Division II	Peach Belt Conference
Columbus State	Public	Cougars	NCAA Division II	Peach Belt Conference
Georgia College	Public	Bobcats	NCAA Division II	Peach Belt Conference
Georgia Southwestern	Public	Hurricanes	NCAA Division II	Peach Belt Conference
North Georgia	Public	Nighthawks	NCAA Division II	Peach Belt Conference
Young Harris	Private	Mountain Lions	NCAA Division II	Conference Carolinas
Albany State	Public	Golden Rams	NCAA Division II	Southern Intercollegiate Athletic Conference
Fort Valley	Public	Wildcats	NCAA Division II	Southern Intercollegiate Athletic Conference
Clark Atlanta	Private	Panthers	NCAA Division II	Southern Intercollegiate Athletic Conference
Middle Georgia	Public	Knights	NCAA Division II	Peach Belt Conference
Morehouse	Private (Male)	Maroon Tigers	NCAA Division II	Southern Intercollegiate Athletic Conference
Savannah State	Public	Tigers	NCAA Division II	Southern Intercollegiate Athletic Conference
Emmanuel	Private	Lions	NCAA Division II NCCAA (Division I)	Conference Carolinas
Coastal Georgia	Public	Mariners	NAIA	Southern States Athletic Conference
Dalton State	Public	Roadrunners	NAIA	Southern States Athletic Conference
Abraham Baldwin	Public	Stallions	NAIA	Southern States Athletic Conference
Brewton–Parker	Private	Barons	NAIA	Southern States Athletic Conference
Brenau	Private	Golden Tigers	NAIA	Southern States Athletic Conference
Life University	Private	Eagles	NAIA	Mid-South Conference
Georgia Gwinnett	Public	Grizzlies	NAIA	Independent
Thomas	Private	Night Hawks	NAIA	Sun Conference
SCAD Savannah	Private	Bees	NAIA	Sun Conference
Reinhardt	Private	Eagles	NAIA	Appalachian Athletic Conference
Point	Private	Skyhawks	NAIA NCCAA (Division I)	Appalachian Athletic Conference
Truett McConnell	Private	Bears	NAIA	Appalachian Athletic Conference
SCAD Atlanta	Private	Bees	NAIA	Appalachian Athletic Conference
Berry	Private	Vikings	NCAA Division III	Southern Athletic Association
Oglethorpe	Private	Stormy Petrels	NCAA Division III	Southern Athletic Association
Agnes Scott	Private (Female)	Scotties	NCAA Division III	USA South Athletic Conference
Covenant	Private	Scots	NCAA Division III	USA South Athletic Conference
LaGrange	Private	Panthers	NCAA Division III	USA South Athletic Conference
Piedmont	Private	Lions	NCAA Division III	USA South Athletic Conference
Wesleyan	Private (Female)	Wolves	NCAA Division III	USA South Athletic Conference
Emory	Private	Eagles	NCAA Division III	University Athletic Association
Atlanta Metropolitan	Public	Trailblazers	NJCAA (Division I)	Georgia Collegiate Athletic Association
East Georgia	Public	Bobcats	NJCAA (Division I)	Georgia Collegiate Athletic Association
Georgia Highlands	Public	Chargers	NJCAA (Division I)	Georgia Collegiate Athletic Association
Gordon State	Public	Highlanders	NJCAA (Division I)	Georgia Collegiate Athletic Association
South Georgia State	Public	Hawks	NJCAA (Division I)	Georgia Collegiate Athletic Association
Andrew	Private	Fighting Tigers	NJCAA (Division I)	Georgia Collegiate Athletic Association
Paine	Private	Lions	NCCAA (Division I)	None
Toccoa Falls	Private	Screaming Eagles	NCCAA (Division II)	None

- ^h Augusta University's men's and women's golf teams compete at the NCAA Division I level.

== Defunct schools ==
=== Public ===
The institutions listed below are no longer independent units of either the University System of Georgia or the Technical College System of Georgia; however, they remain operational as instructional sites for their respective successor institutions.

==== University System of Georgia ====
Institution	Main Campus Location	Founded	Defunct	Notes
Armstrong State University	Savannah	1935	2018	Consolidated with Georgia Southern University
Augusta State University	Augusta	1785	2013	Consolidated with Georgia Health Sciences University to form Augusta University
Bainbridge State College	Bainbridge	1970	2017	Consolidated with Abraham Baldwin Agricultural College
Darton State College	Albany	1963	2016	Consolidated with Albany State University
East Georgia State College	Swainsboro	1973	2026	Consolidated with Georgia Southern University
Gainesville State College	Gainesville	1964	2013	Consolidated with North Georgia College and State University to form the University of North Georgia
Georgia Perimeter College	Clarkston	1964	2016	Consolidated with Georgia State University
Macon State College	Macon	1965	2013	Consolidated with Middle Georgia State College and subsequently elevated to university status as Middle Georgia State University
Southern Polytechnic State University	Marietta	1948	2015	Consolidated with Kennesaw State University
Waycross College	Waycross	1976	2013	Consolidated with South Georgia State College

==== Technical College System of Georgia ====
Institution	Main Campus Location	Founded	Defunct	Notes
Altamaha Technical College	Jesup	1989	2014	Consolidated with Okefenokee Technical College and renamed Coastal Pines Technical College
Appalachian Technical College	Jasper	1967	2009	Consolidated with Chattahoochee Technical College
East Central Technical College	Fitzgerald	1970	2010	Consolidated with Valdosta Technical College and renamed Wiregrass Georgia Technical College
Flint River Technical College	Thomaston	1961	2010	Consolidated with Griffin Technical College and renamed Southern Crescent Technical College
Georgia Aviation Technical College	Eastman	1996	2007	Consolidated with Middle Georgia College (now Middle Georgia State University) as its aviation campus
Heart of Georgia Technical College	Dublin	1984	2011	Consolidated with Sandersville Technical College and renamed Oconee Fall Line Technical College
Middle Georgia Technical College	Warner Robins	1973	2013	Consolidated with Central Georgia Technical College
Moultrie Technical College	Moultrie	1964	2016	Consolidated with Southwest Georgia Technical College and renamed Southern Regional Technical College
North Metro Technical College	Acworth	1985	2009	Consolidated with Chattahoochee Technical College
Northwestern Technical College	Rock Spring	1966	2009	Consolidated with Coosa Valley Technical College and renamed Georgia Northwestern Technical College
Swainsboro Technical College	Swainsboro	1963	2009	Consolidated with Southeastern Technical College
West Central Technical College	Waco	1968	2009	Consolidated with West Georgia Technical College

=== Private ===
Institution	Main Campus Location	Founded	Affiliation	Defunct	Notes
Art Institute of Atlanta	Atlanta	1975	For-profit	2023	
Atlanta College of Art	Atlanta	1905	Woodruff Arts Center	2006	Merged with SCAD Atlanta
Atlanta Conservatory of Music	Atlanta	1907		1936	School destroyed by fire
Laurus Technical Institute	Atlanta	1986	For-profit	2015	
Martin Institute	Jefferson	1818		1942	
Southern Catholic College	Dawsonville	2000	Archdiocese of Atlanta	2010	
Tift College	Forsyth	1849	Georgia Baptist Convention	1986	Merged with Mercer University

== See also ==
- List of college athletic programs in Alabama
- Georgia Board of Regents
- University System of Georgia
- Georgia Research Alliance
- HOPE Scholarship
- Southern Association of Colleges and Schools
- Higher education in the United States
- Lists of American institutions of higher education
- List of recognized higher education accreditation organizations
