= Technical College System of Georgia =

Public technical college system in Georgia, USA

Coordinates: 33.84858°N 84.31400°W

- Abbreviation: TCSG
- Formation: 2007
- Purpose: educational oversight
- Headquarters: Atlanta, Georgia, United States
- Region served: Georgia
- Members: 22 colleges, which includes a total of 85 campuses
- Commissioner: Greg Dozier
- Website: www.tcsg.edu

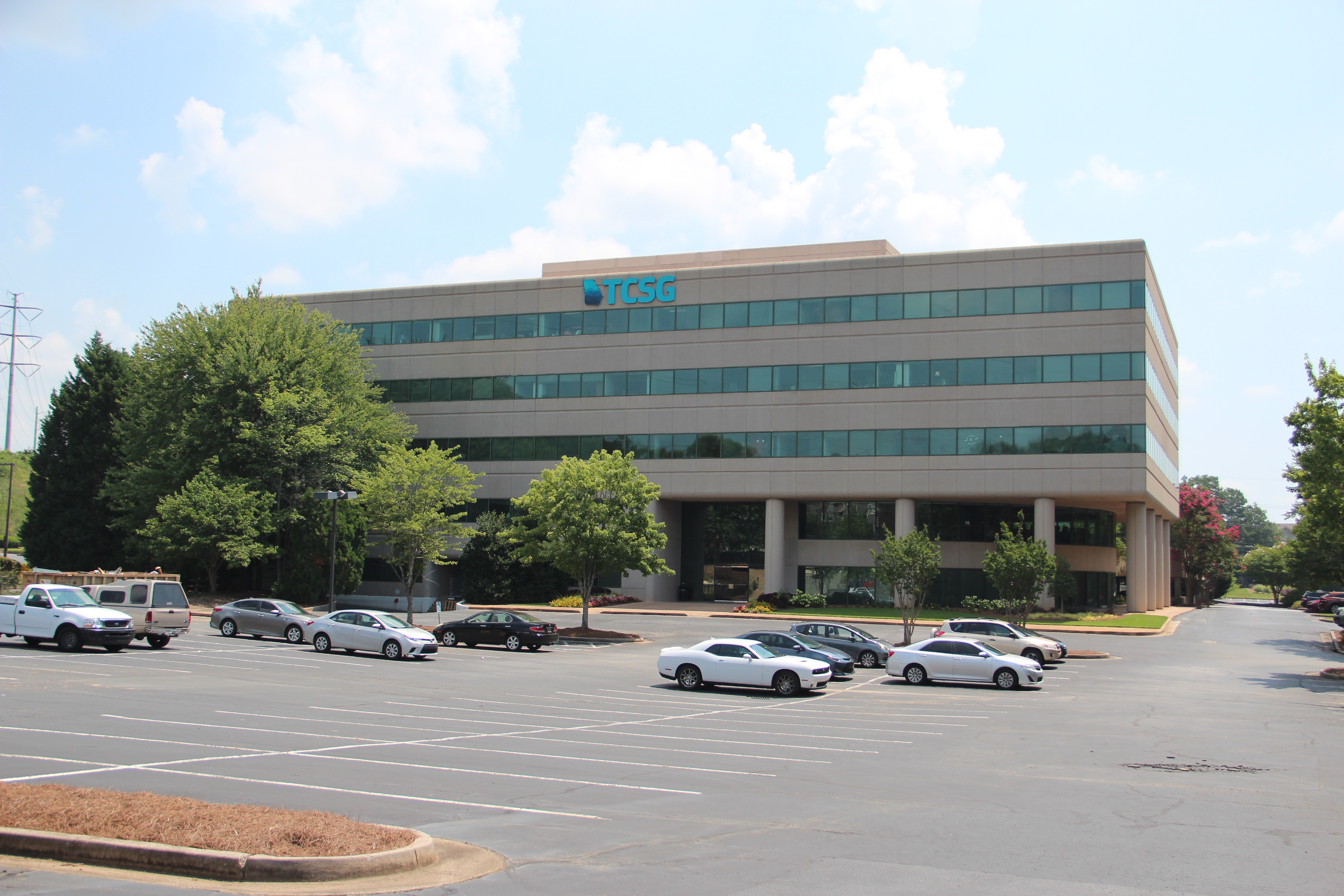
TCSG headquarters in Atlanta

The Technical College System of Georgia (TCSG), formerly known as the Department of Technical and Adult Education (DTAE), is the State of Georgia Government Agency which supervises the U.S. state of Georgia's 22 technical colleges, while also surveying the adult literacy program and economic and workforce development programs. The system operates the Georgia Virtual Technical Connection, a clearinghouse for online technical courses. The TCSG serves the people and the state by creating a system of technical education whose purpose is to use the latest technology and easy access for all adult Georgians and corporate citizens.

The Technical College System and the University System of Georgia (USG) are completely separate agencies and work entirely independently of each other, except for certain cooperative efforts. Some core courses are transferable between the two, though this was made more difficult when the USG moved to the semester system in 1997, while the TCSG remained on the quarter system. The TCSG changed to the semester system in Fall 2011. The TCSG worked with the state budget office to minimize the economic impact of the conversion, believing a move is in the best interests of TCSG students.

In 2008, the question of merging some schools arose. The first such merger was that of Georgia Aviation Technical College in Eastman into the USG's Middle Georgia College (now known as Middle Georgia State University) in 2007, effective July 1. In September 2008, the State Board of Technical and Adult Education voted to merge thirteen colleges into six. The board stated that the mergers only affect the administrative functions of the colleges.

When the University System of Georgia mandated semesters in 1998, enrollment fell by several thousand students, and those that remained took fewer courses, causing budget shortfalls which the state legislature had to make up for.

== List of technical colleges ==
Location of TCSG campuses. For colleges with multiple campuses, the largest campus is labeled.

Institution	Main Campus Location	Founded	President	Enrollment (AY 2025)	Additional Locations	Counties Served
Albany Technical College	Albany	1961	Emmett Griswold	4,021	N/A	Baker, Calhoun, Clay, Dougherty, Lee, Randolph, Terrell
Athens Technical College	Athens	1958	Andrea Daniel	5,971	Elberton, Monroe	Clarke, Elbert, Greene, Hart, Madison, Morgan, Oconee, Oglethorpe, Taliaferro, Walton, Wilkes
Atlanta Technical College	Atlanta	1945	Victoria Seals	6,666	N/A	Clayton, Fulton (South and Central)
Augusta Technical College	Augusta	1961	Kendricks Hooker	6,335	Grovetown, Summerville, Thomson, Waynesboro	Burke, Columbia, Lincoln, McDuffie, Richmond
Central Georgia Technical College	Warner Robins	2013 (Note: Lineage dates back to 1962.)	Ivan H. Allen	16,003	Eatonton, Hawkinsville, Gray, Forsyth, Fort Valley, Jeffersonville, Macon, Milledgeville, Roberta	Bibb, Crawford, Dooly, Houston, Jones, Monroe, Peach, Pulaski, Putnam, Twiggs
Chattahoochee Technical College	Marietta	2009 (Note: Lineage dates back to 1963.)	Heather Pence	15,951	Acworth, Austell, Canton, Dallas, Jasper, Woodstock	Bartow, Cherokee, Cobb, Gilmer, Paulding, Pickens
Coastal Pines Technical College	Waycross	2014 (Note: Lineage dates back to 1965.)	Lonnie Roberts	6,065	Alma, Baxley, Brunswick, Hazlehurst, Jesup, Kingsland	Appling, Bacon, Brantley, Camden, Charlton, Clinch, Glynn, Jeff Davis, Long, McIntosh, Pierce, Ware, Wayne
Columbus Technical College	Columbus	1961	Martha Ann Todd	5,049	N/A	Chattahoochee, Harris, Muscogee, Quitman, Stewart, Talbot
Georgia Northwestern Technical College	Rome	2009 (Note: Lineage dates back to 1962.)	Heidi Popham	9,342	Calhoun, Dalton, Ringgold, Rock Spring, Rockmart	Catoosa, Chattooga, Dade, Floyd, Gordon, Murray, Polk, Walker, Whitfield
Georgia Piedmont Technical College	Clarkston	1961	Tavarez Holston	4,609	Conyers, Covington	DeKalb, Newton, Rockdale
Gwinnett Technical College	Lawrenceville	1984	D. Glen Cannon	15,689	Alpharetta	Fulton (North), Gwinnett
Lanier Technical College	Gainesville	1966	Tim McDonald	9,249	Commerce, Cumming, Dawsonville, Winder	Banks, Barrow, Dawson, Forsyth, Hall, Jackson, Lumpkin
North Georgia Technical College	Clarkesville	1944	John Wilkinson	3,643	Blairsville, Toccoa	Fannin, Franklin, Habersham, Rabun, Stephens, Towns, Union, White
Oconee Fall Line Technical College	Sandersville	2011 (Note: Lineage dates back to 1984.)	Erica Harden	3,091	Dublin, Louisville	Bleckley, Dodge, Glascock, Hancock, Jefferson, Laurens, Telfair, Washington, Wheeler, Wilkinson
Ogeechee Technical College	Statesboro	1986	Lori S. Durden	3,210	Hagan, Sylvania	Bulloch, Evans, Screven
Savannah Technical College	Savannah	1929	Ryan Foley	5,801	Hinesville, Rincon	Bryan, Chatham, Effingham, Liberty
South Georgia Technical College	Americus	1948	John Watford	2,632	Cordele	Crisp, Macon, Marion, Schley, Sumter, Taylor, Webster
Southeastern Technical College	Vidalia	2009 (Note: Lineage dates back to 1963.)	Larry Calhoun	2,627	Swainsboro	Candler, Emanuel, Jenkins, Johnson, Montgomery, Tattnall, Toombs, Treutlen
Southern Crescent Technical College	Griffin	2010 (Note: Lineage dates back to 1961.)	Irvin Clark	9,330	Jackson, McDonough, Monticello, Peachtree City, Thomaston	Butts, Fayette, Henry, Jasper, Lamar, Pike, Spalding, Upson
Southern Regional Technical College	Thomasville	2015 (Note: Lineage dates back to 1947.)	Jim Glass	7,443	Ashburn, Bainbridge, Blakely, Cairo, Camilla, Colquitt, Donalsonville, Moultrie, Sylvester, Tifton	Colquitt, Decatur, Early, Grady, Miller, Mitchell, Seminole, Thomas, Tift, Turner, Worth
West Georgia Technical College	Waco	2009 (Note: Lineage dates back to 1966.)	Julie Post	9,896	Carrollton, Douglasville, Franklin, Greenville, LaGrange, Newnan	Carroll, Coweta, Douglas, Haralson, Meriwether, Troup
Wiregrass Georgia Technical College	Valdosta	2010 (Note: Lineage dates back to 1963.)	DeAnnia Clements	6,657	Douglas, Fitzgerald, Sparks	Atkinson, Ben Hill, Berrien, Brooks, Cook, Coffee, Echols, Irwin, Lanier, Lowndes, Wilcox

=== Defunct institutions ===
These institutions were formerly independent units of the TCSG; however, they were merged with other institutions, with most of the mergers occurring during the Technical College System consolidation of 2009.

Institution	Main Campus Location	Founded	Defunct	Notes
Altamaha Technical College	Jesup	1989	2014	Consolidated with Okefenokee Technical College and renamed Coastal Pines Technical College
Appalachian Technical College	Jasper	1967	2009	Consolidated with Chattahoochee Technical College
East Central Technical College	Fitzgerald	1970	2010	Consolidated with Valdosta Technical College and renamed Wiregrass Georgia Technical College
Flint River Technical College	Thomaston	1961	2010	Consolidated with Griffin Technical College and renamed Southern Crescent Technical College
Georgia Aviation Technical College	Eastman	1996	2007	Consolidated with Middle Georgia College (now Middle Georgia State University) as its aviation campus
Heart of Georgia Technical College	Dublin	1984	2011	Consolidated with Sandersville Technical College and renamed Oconee Fall Line Technical College
Middle Georgia Technical College	Warner Robins	1973	2013	Consolidated with Central Georgia Technical College
Moultrie Technical College	Moultrie	1964	2016	Consolidated with Southwest Georgia Technical College and renamed Southern Regional Technical College
North Metro Technical College	Acworth	1985	2009	Consolidated with Chattahoochee Technical College
Northwestern Technical College	Rock Spring	1966	2009	Consolidated with Coosa Valley Technical College and renamed Georgia Northwestern Technical College
Swainsboro Technical College	Swainsboro	1963	2009	Consolidated with Southeastern Technical College
West Central Technical College	Waco	1968	2009	Consolidated with West Georgia Technical College

== Former and Inactive Campaigns ==
- [TCSGSemester411(.com) - Information regarding the TCSG's quarter to semester conversion (no longer active)]
