= North Metro Technical College =

College in Georgia, US

Coordinates: 34.08279°N 84.67220°W

- Type: Public
- Established: 1989
- President: Ron Newcomb (Interim/Final)
- Students: 2000
- Location: Acworth, Georgia, U.S.
- Campus: suburban
- Mascot: Blue Devils

North Metro Technical College (commonly North Metro Tech, or NMTC ) was a two-year state technical college located in the state of Georgia, and governed by the Technical College System of Georgia. The college was accredited by the Commission on Colleges of the Southern Association of Colleges and Schools to award associate degrees since 2006. Since the beginning of July 2009, it is now the North Metro campus of nearby Chattahoochee Technical College.

== Location ==
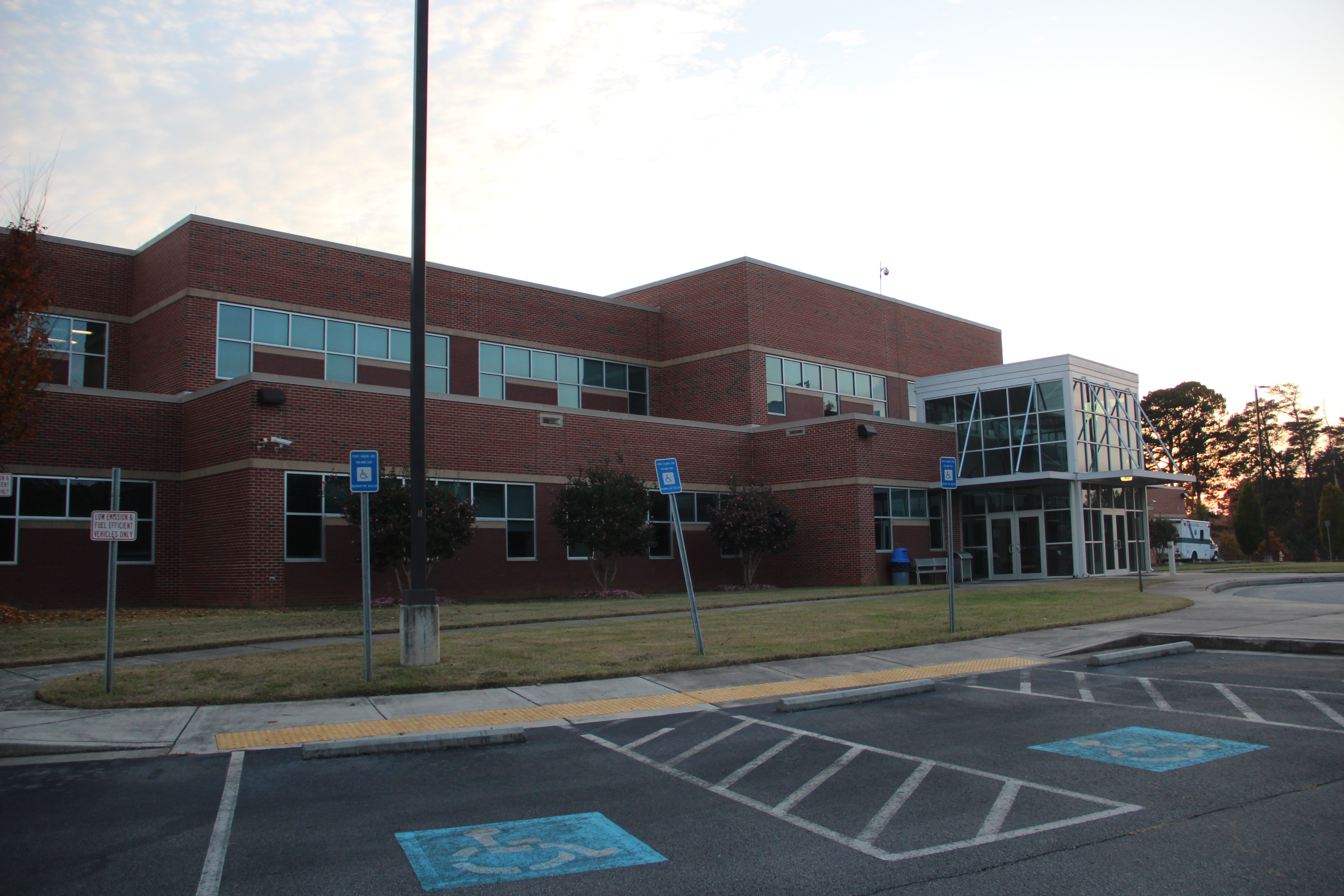
Health Education Center

As suggested by its name, North Metro primarily served students from four suburban counties of north-northwestern metropolitan Atlanta: Cobb, Bartow, Cherokee, and Paulding, where together almost all of its student body resides. Forty percent live in Cobb, while over one quarter of the students live in Bartow.

The campus, now a campus of Chattahoochee Technical College is located in the southeast corner of Bartow County, however the street address is listed as Acworth, which is across the county line in Cobb. It is located west of I-75, with exits 278 (Glade Road) and 277 (Georgia 92) being the most convenient exits to the campus.

== Enrollment ==
The college operated on the quarter system, as opposed to the semester system. As a college, there were on average 2000 students enrolled during each quarter, with the summer quarter having the lowest level of attendance. During the fiscal year of 2008 (July 2007 to June 2008), the student population of NMTC increased by just over 10%, compared to an average increase of 3.6% for the entire Technical College System of Georgia. The college also experienced a large increase in its FTE (full-time equivalent) growth level, which is calculated by comparing the total number of students to the total number enrollment hours and producing a figure that would reflect a full-time student population of 100%. It is reported that the college is enrolling both an increasing number of younger students, many of whom are just out of high school, and a greater number of full-time students. The Cartersville based Daily Tribune News reported on July 22, 2008, that enrollment for the summer 2008 quarter was the highest summer enrollment ever, with over 1,500 students enrolled.

== Programs ==
List of general program areas offered by the college:

- Accounting
- Automotive
- Business
- Commercial Truck Driving
- Computer Information Systems
- Cosmetology
- Diesel Equipment Technology
- Early Childhood Care and Education
- Electronics
- Environmental Horticulture
- Health
- Industrial Systems
- Management and Supervisory Development
- Marketing Management
- Medical Assisting
- Paramedic and EMT
- Practical Nursing
- Radiography
- Technical Studies
- Visual Communications

== Sports ==
It was announced in the summer of 2008 that North Metro Technical College would begin an intercollegiate sports program, which would be at the club level The teams would consist of men's basketball and women's volleyball. Teams from NMTC would be part of the Technical College System of Georgia Athletic Conference. The NMTC teams would compete against Northwestern Technical College, Coosa Valley Technical College, West Central Technical College, and Griffin Technical College. The mascot 'Blue Devils' was selected in part to honor the Summer Hill School, a defunct public school in nearby Cartersville, Georgia.

== Relationship with Georgia Highlands ==
Until August 2008, Georgia Highlands College held classes and had offices on the NMTC campus. This collaboration involved the sharing of classrooms and spaces such as the college library. Georgia Highlands began to move its classes to Southern Polytechnic State University in Marietta in the summer of 2008, citing space needs for both GHC and NMTC. The main campus of Georgia Highlands College is located in Rome, Georgia.

== Consolidation ==
It was officially announced on August 8, 2008, that approval had been given for the consolidation of North Metro Technical College with Chattahoochee Technical College. A primary reason given for the merger was the geographic proximity of the two institutions. The NMTC campus and the main Chattahoochee Campus are about 15 miles or 25 km apart. Chattahoochee also has three satellite campuses: in Dallas (Paulding campus), Mableton (South Cobb campus), and northeast Cobb (Mountain View campus). In October 2008, Appalachian Technical College was added to the merger, including its nearby satellite campus in Woodstock, and its much further main campus, located outside metro Atlanta in Jasper. Although the DTAE (now TCSG) system has normally named satellite campuses by the county they are in, NMTC is now the North Metro campus of Chattahoochee Technical College in honor of its previous service as a separate college. It was announced that Sanford Chandler would become the President of the new institution.
