= East Central Technical College =

Coordinates: 30°53′24″N 83°21′14″W

Until July 1, 2010, East Central Technical College was a technical college within the Technical College System of Georgia. Its primary locations were in Fitzgerald and Ocilla, with a satellite and extended campuses located in Douglas, Pearson, and Rochelle. The school served the counties of Ben Hill/Irwin, Coffee, Atkinson, and Wilcox. Tift and Turner counties were originally to have been part of the school's area, but opted out before it began. The school also previously had campuses in Turner and Telfair counties, but in 2001 the Turner campus was transferred to Moultrie Technical College, and the Telfair campus to Heart of Georgia Technical College.

On September 4, 2008, the State Board of Technical and Adult Education approved a merger East Central Technical College and Valdosta Technical College, effective July 1, 2010, as part of a larger program of restructuring throughout the TCSG. In 2009, it was announced that the new school would be known as Wiregrass Georgia Technical College. The merger was completed, as planned, on July 1, 2010.

== History ==
In 1968 Lewis Brinson became the first director of Ben Hill-Irwin Area Vocational Institute. On September 21, 1970 200 full-time students enrolled at the institution and on September 15, 1971 the first full-time graduates received their diplomas. On June 9, 1978 a $600,000 campus expansion plan was completed. The school changed from being locally governed to being governed by the state under the direction of the Georgia Department of Technical and Adult Education (DTAE). In the fall of 1982, Ben Hill-Irwin Institute began a computer electronics program. It also expanded its machine shop curriculum through a co-op program with Robins Air Force Base in 1983. January 1, 1984 Dr. Ed Green became the new president after the retirement of Brinson. The school changed its name to Ben Hill Irwin Technical Institute and established a joint degree program with Abraham Baldwin Agricultural College (ABAC) in Tifton, which made it possible for ECTC students to earn an associate degree in applied science from ABAC in 1986. According to ectcollege.org on July 1, 1996 Dr. Diane Harper became the third president. On November 7, 1996 the school changed its name to East Central Technical Institute. Over the next few years, enrollment increased tremendously and the support of the community continued to grow. The college continued to expand throughout the 1990s with the opening of the Charles Harris Learning Center in 1994, the Douglas satellite campus in 1997, on July 16, 1998 the opening of the Wilcox Lifelong Learning Center, and on April 28, 1999 the new campus in Turner County. The name changed again to East Central Technical College in 2000 because of Georgia House bill 1187, that allowed institutes offering associate degrees to become colleges.

== Accreditation ==
East Central Technical College was accredited by the Commission of the Council on Occupational Education to award associate degrees of applied technology, diplomas, and technical certificates of credit.
