= Bainbridge State College =

- Type: Public college
- Active: 1970–2017
- Parent institution: University System of Georgia
- President: Stuart Rayfield (interim)
- Students: 4000
- Location: Bainbridge, Georgia, United States; 30.8992°N 84.5345°W
- Colors: Green and white
- Website: bainbridge.edu

Bainbridge State College was a public college in Bainbridge, Georgia. It was part of the University System of Georgia which merged it into Abraham Baldwin Agricultural College in 2017 while the campus, buildings, and acreage are owned and operated by Southern Regional Technical College (SRTC).

The former college campus was located on 173 acres (0.70 km^{2}) of land just inside the Bainbridge city limits on U.S. Highway 84 East. In 2018, Southern Regional Technical College (SRTC) acquired ownership of the former Bainbridge State College campus, including its buildings and acreage, and assumed responsibility for all technical programs and several degree, diploma, and certificate programs previously offered at the Shotwell Street campus, as well as the former Bainbridge State College Midtown location. Abraham Baldwin Agricultural College (ABAC) continues to utilize space on the campus for select programs.

A separate campus in Blakely, Georgia was Bainbridge College Early County (which was built in 1999 as Albany Technical College. The Early County Satellite Center was bought by Bainbridge College in 2006). There was also a campus in Donalsonville, Georgia that opened in 2016.

Students commuted from the nearby towns of Attapulgus, Blakely, Brinson, Cairo, Camilla, Climax, Colquitt, Donalsonville, Iron City, Pelham, Thomasville, and Whigham. Following the addition of Gadsden County to the college's service area, students from neighboring Florida communities also attended as in-state students.

== History ==
The college was established in 1970 with support of local citizens, including former Georgia governor Marvin Griffin, and its doors opened in 1973, during the governorship of Jimmy Carter. Edward Mobley was the first president. He served from the beginning of the college until 1999, when Clifford Brock took over, for a tenure that saw enrollment grow by 256 percent. Minority enrollment grew from 24 percent to more than 50 percent as students flocked to the formerly tiny school. Thomas Wilkerson became president in 2005.

The 1973 charter faculty consisted of Robert DuBay, Dean; R. Everett Langford, Chemistry and Geology; and Ray Chambers, History.

On February 13, 2013, the Board of Regents for the University System of Georgia officially announced that Bainbridge College had been converted into a 4-year state college, and its name was officially changed to Bainbridge State College.

In 2017, the college ceased to exist as a separate entity. The consolidation of Bainbridge State College with Abraham Baldwin Agricultural College (ABAC) became official December 2017 upon the approval of the Board of Regents of the University System of Georgia.

In 2018, Southern Regional Technical College (SRTC) acquired ownership of the former Bainbridge State College campus, including its buildings and approximately 173 acres of property. SRTC also assumed responsibility for all technical programs formerly offered at the Bainbridge campus. Since acquiring the campus, Southern Regional Technical College (SRTC) has expanded program offerings on the Bainbridge and Midtown campuses to include high school equivalency courses, general education (core courses), and 65 programs other programs.
