= Altamaha Technical College =

Technical college in southeast Georgia, U.S.

- Former name: Altamaha Technical Institute
- Type: Community Technical College
- Established: January 3, 1985
- President: Lorette M. Hoover
- Students: 986 (2009)
- Location: Jesup, Georgia, United States; 31°37′18″N 81°54′36″W
- Campus: Multiple campuses
- Colors: Brown and white
- Website: http://www.altamahatech.edu/

Altamaha Technical College (ATC) was a unit of the Technical College System of Georgia (TCSG) and provided education for a seven-county service area in southeast Georgia, United States. The school's service area included Appling, Camden, Glynn, Jeff Davis, Long, McIntosh and Wayne counties. Coastal Pines Technical College was established on July 1, 2014, from the merger of Altamaha Technical College (est. 1989) and Okefenokee Technical College (est. 1965).

ATC was accredited by the Accrediting Commission of the Council on Occupational Education, and was a candidate for accreditation with the Commission on Colleges of the Southern Association of Colleges and Schools to award associate degrees, Diplomas, and Technical Certificates of Credit. Some of the school's technical programs are accredited by their accreditation organizations.

== History ==
ATC roots go back to January 1985, when the Georgia legislature was first lobbied to create the school. In December 1985, the State Board of Postsecondary Vocational-Technical Education voted to create the school, whose service area was focused on Appling and Wayne counties and was named Altamaha Technical Institute. Classes were first held in July 1989, when an LPN program was transferred to ATC from Waycross-Ware Tech (now Okefenokee Technical College). In 1992, ATC gained accreditation from the Council on Occupational Education, a national institutional accrediting agency based in Georgia and recognized by the Department of Education. In early 2000, Altamaha Tech was approved by the State Board of Technical and Adult Education to offer Associate of Applied Technology (AAT) degree programs.

Altamaha Technical Institute was renamed Altamaha Technical College in September, 2000.

== Locations ==
ATC's primary campus was located in Jesup. The school also had campuses in Baxley, Hazlehurst, Kingsland, and Brunswick.

== Official symbol ==
Altamaha Tech's Dodecahedron

The Dodecahedron was the official symbol of Altamaha Technical College. The twelve faceted sides are pentagons that represent the multiple facets of technical education, and is a reminder to stay focused on the future and to be multifaceted in the school's programs and services. The inspiration for this choice was the design for the deep space probes in the novel Contact by Carl Sagan.
