= Swainsboro Technical College =

Public college in Georgia (1963–2009)

Coordinates: 32.72347°N 82.70243°W

Swainsboro Technical College was a technical college within the Technical College System of Georgia. On July 1, 2009, Swainsboro Tech was officially merged with Southeastern Technical College in Vidalia.

== History ==
Established in 1963 as the Swainsboro Area Vocational and Technical School, the school opened with 4 programs of study, 7 employees, and an initial enrollment of 32 students. The school was initially given responsibility of serving the citizens of twenty counties, the largest area ever to be served by a technical school in Georgia. With rapid growth, the original building was renovated and an additional building was built in 1978. In 1987, the school converted to state governance as the Department of Technical and Adult Education was formed, and the school changed its name to Swainsboro Technical Institute. In 1988, a building for the newly developed Child Care program was constructed and in 1995, a 20,000-square-foot (1,900 m^{2}) building for health programs, Adult Education, and administrative offices was dedicated. In 2000, as part of then Governor Roy Barnes' Education Reform Act, the college assumed its current name. This name change provides a more accurate labeling for the type of education that the college delivers to the community. Also in 2000, Swainsboro Technical College acquired property that had previously been the local high school and renovated two of the buildings. Swainsboro Technical College opened its newest facility, the Larry J. "Butch" Parrish Technology Center, in the fall of 2003. The Swainsboro Campus consists of eight buildings on approximately thirty acres of land.

== Merger with Southeastern Technical College ==
In September 2008, the Board to the TCSG voted to consolidate 13 of its technical colleges into six to save $3.5 million on its annual budget, with Swainsboro Tech merging with Southeastern by July 2009, although this decision was met with concern from local leaders in Swainsboro and Emanuel County, believing that the same amount of money could be saved by other means.

The Technical College System of Georgia's board voted during its November meeting to reconsider the merger until its December meeting. State representative Butch Parrish from the Swainsboro area spoke to the state board regarding his opposition to the merger. One other state board member echoed his concern at the state level. Another board member made a motion to reconsider the merger until the December board meeting. The state board approved the motion with one dissent.

The Boards of Directors of Southeastern Technical College and Swainsboro Technical College held a joint meeting on January 22, 2009, to discuss the merger between the two colleges. The boards voted unanimously to retain the name 'Southeastern Technical College.'
