= Laurus Technical Institute =

American for-protit college in Georgia

Coordinates: 33.754319°N 84.547790°W

- Type: For-profit
- Active: 1986–2015
- Location: Decatur, Jonesboro, West Atlanta, Georgia, United States
- Website: https://web.archive.org/web/20071011040636/http://www.laurus.edu/

Laurus Technical Institute was an American for-profit technical college with three locations in Georgia. The school was founded in 1986 as ETI Careers Institute and offered travel and tourism programs. It became accredited in 1991. In 2007, the school changed its name to Laurus Technical Institute and began offering programs in allied health and allied trade programs.

CEO Terry Hess closed the school without notice in March 2015.

== Accreditation ==
Laurus Technical Institute was accredited by the Accrediting Commission of Career Schools and Colleges (ACCSC) and authorized by Georgia's Nonpublic Postsecondary Education Commission. Laurus Technical Institute also participated in federal Title IV Student Assistance programs and was approved for the training of veterans in the state of Georgia.

== Programs ==
- Medical Assistant
- Medical billing and Coding
- Medical Office Administration
- HVAC training (Heating, Ventilation, Air Conditioning and Refrigeration

== Locations ==
- Decatur, Georgia
- Jonesboro, Georgia
- Atlanta, Georgia

== See also ==
- List of colleges and universities in Georgia (U.S. state)
