= Savannah Technical College =

Technical college in Georgia, Georgia

Coordinates: 32°1′24.91″N 81°6′51.54″W

- Type: Public Technical College
- Established: 1929; 97 years ago
- President: Ryan W. Foley
- Students: 3,942 (fall 2024)
- Location: Savannah, Georgia, USA
- Campus: Urban
- Mascot: Otter
- Website: http://www.savannahtech.edu/

Savannah Technical College (Savannah Tech) is a public community college in Savannah, Georgia. It is a part of the Technical College System of Georgia and provides education services for Bryan, Chatham, Effingham and Liberty counties.

== Academics ==
Savannah Technical College is accredited by the Southern Association of Colleges and Schools Commission on Colleges (SACSCOC) to award associate degrees, diplomas and technical certificates of credit.

The College's Learning Enrichment Center (LEC) is certified by the College Reading and Learning Association (CRLA).

Savannah Technical College is governed by the Technical College System of Georgia. The college also offers free Adult Education/ESL programs as well as industry-specific non-credit programs in the four-county service area of Bryan, Chatham, Effingham, and Liberty counties.

== Campuses ==
Savannah Technical College's main campus is located at 5717 White Bluff Road, Savannah, GA, with additional locations including the Crossroads/Aviation campus, Liberty Campus in Hinesville, Effingham Campus in Springfield, West Chatham Technology Center in Pooler, and the Savannah Culinary Institute in downtown Savannah.
