= Gwinnett Technical College =

Public college in Lawernceville, Georgia, US

Coordinates: 33.96274°N 84.06749°W

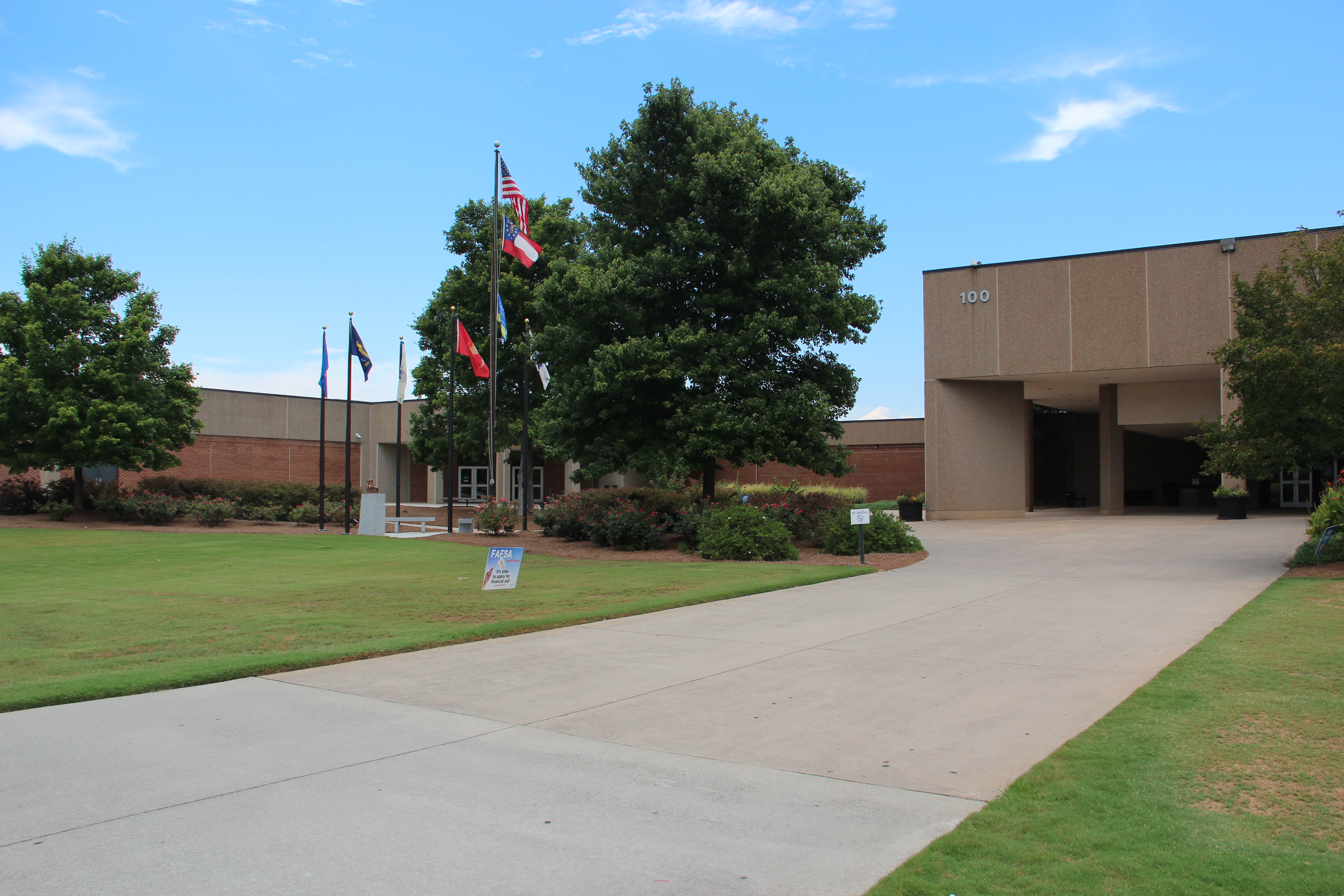
Gwinnett Technical College Main Building

Gwinnett Technical College is a public technical college in the U.S. state of Georgia with campuses in unincorporated Gwinnett County (Lawrenceville address) and Alpharetta. It is a unit of the Technical College System of Georgia and is accredited by the Southern Association of Colleges and Schools. Since opening its doors as the Gwinnett Area Technical School in 1984, the college has added numerous programs of study, made two name changes, expanded its facilities and experienced enrollment growth. Currently, the Lawrenceville campus is 88 acres and the Alpharetta-North Fulton Campus is 25 acres. It had an enrollment of 11,166 students in fall 2024.

== History ==
The Gwinnett Area Technical School was founded in 1984 to meet the demand for technological training. The school subsequently expanded its offerings to include a wider variety of high-tech programs. In 1988, the name was changed to Gwinnett Technical Institute, aligning Gwinnett Tech with the network of state technical institutes under the Georgia Department of Technical and Adult Education (DTAE).

The following year, DTAE approved Gwinnett Tech to grant associate degrees in applied technology (AAT) in six programming areas, which paved the way for Gwinnett Tech to pursue accreditation with the Southern Association of Colleges and Schools Commission on Colleges.

Gwinnett Technical Institute changed its name on July 6, 2000, to Gwinnett Technical College to better reflect its position within the region's higher education market. The name change was made possible by Georgia's A+ Education Reform Act of 2000, which allowed technical institutes with proper accreditation to be designated as colleges.
