= Lanier Technical College =

Technical college in Georgia, United States

- Former names: Gainesville-Hall County Area Vocational Trade School, Lanier Area Vocational-Technical School
- Type: Public technical college
- Established: December 1964
- Parent institution: Technical College System of Georgia
- President: Mr. Tim McDonald
- Students: 6,908 (fall 2024)
- Location: Gainesville, Georgia, United States; 34°19′51″N 83°46′41″W
- Campus: Multiple campuses
- Colors: Green, Blue
- Website: www.laniertech.edu

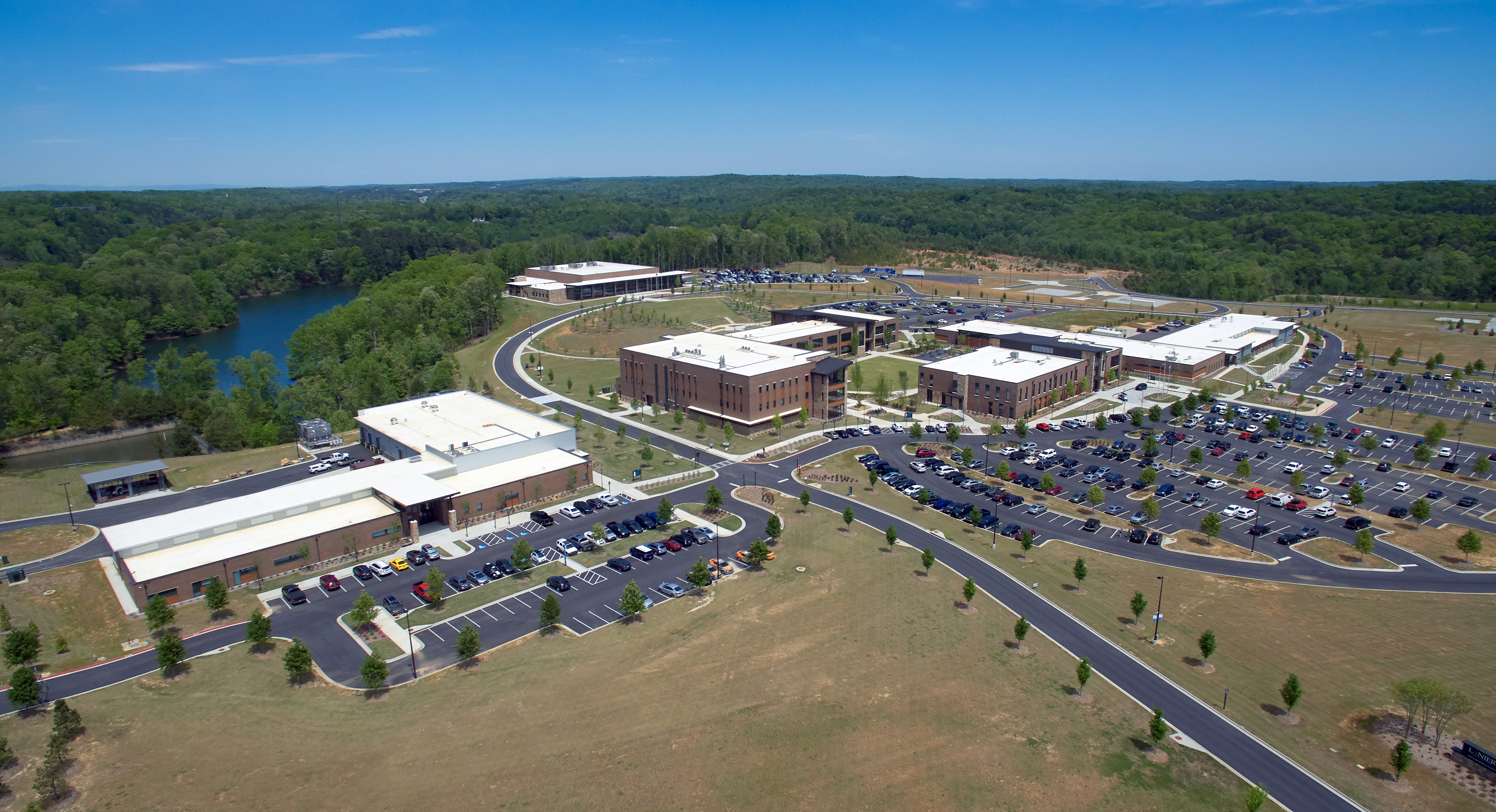
Aerial View of the Hall County Campus

Lanier Technical College (LTC or Lanier Tech) is a public technical college with multiple locations in the U.S. state of Georgia. It is part of the Technical College System of Georgia and provides education services for a seven-county service area in north Georgia. The school's service area includes Banks, Barrow, Dawson, Forsyth, Hall, Jackson, and Lumpkin counties. Lanier Tech is accredited by the Commission on Colleges of the Southern Association of Colleges and Schools and many of the school's individual technical programs are also accredited by their respective accreditation organizations.

== History ==
The school was originally chartered by the Georgia State Board of Education in December 1964, as the Gainesville-Hall County Area Vocational Trade School. Its name was changed ten months later to Lanier Area Vocational-Technical School. The first classes at LTC were held in Fall, 1966, with classes initially held in various local schools, churches, and civic buildings. The school moved into the first building in Oakwood in January 1967. The school has since moved to their current location in Gainesville in 2019.

The school has 4 campuses in addition to its Hall campus in Gainesville. The Forsyth Campus, in Cumming, was opened in 1998. Campuses were opened in Winder in 2002, in Commerce in 2003, and in Dawsonville in 2005.

Lanier Tech also offers GED and ESL classes at various locations through its seven-county service area.

Lanier Tech built a new $100 million campus along I-985 which opened in 2019. The University of North Georgia has since taken over the previous Oakwood campus.
