= Georgia Piedmont Technical College =

Coordinates: 33.78982°N 84.23441°W

- Former names: DeKalb Technical College, DeKalb Community College, DeKalb Area Vocational School
- Type: Public community college
- Established: 1961
- Parent institution: Technical College System of Georgia
- Students: 3,282 (fall 2024)
- Location: Clarkston, Georgia, United States
- Campus: Multiple campuses
- Colors: Red, Yellow and Blue
- Website: www.gptc.edu/

Georgia Piedmont Technical College (GPTC) is a public community college based in Clarkston, Georgia. It is part of the Technical College System of Georgia (TCSG) and provides education for a three-county service area, mostly in the metro Atlanta area. The school's service area includes Dekalb, Rockdale, and Newton counties. GPTC is accredited by the Commission on Colleges of the Southern Association of Colleges and Schools (SACS) to award associate degrees, diplomas, and technical certificates of credit. Many of the school's individual technical programs are also accredited by their respective accreditation organizations. The College also offers free Adult Education courses for GED and HiSet test preparation and English as Second Language programming. Its Economic Development and Continuing Education division provides customized business and industry training to strengthen the workforce pipeline in Metro Atlanta.

== History ==
GPTC was first established in 1961 as DeKalb Area Vocational School. The college was initially organized in cooperation with the Vocational Division of the State Department of Education and operated by the DeKalb County Board of Education. DeKalb Technical College operated as a division and campus of Georgia Perimeter College (known then as Dekalb College) from 1972 to 1986, and as the post secondary unit of DeKalb County School System until June 30, 1996. On July 1, 1996, DeKalb Tech began operating as a unit of the Technical College System of Georgia. In 2000, DeKalb Technical Institute's name was officially changed to DeKalb Technical College.

The college enrolled its first class of 18 students in Electronics Technology in 1961. At that time, the college was in temporary quarters while the DeKalb Campus facility was under construction. The facility on North Indian Creek Drive in Clarkston opened in October 1963 and consists of five buildings, totaling 275,000 square feet of floor space.

In 2018, the U.S. Department of Education placed the college on heightened cash monitoring status, a status that places additional financial demands on the college as related to federal financial aid. Shortly thereafter, the college's began investigating finances at the college. As a result, the college's president, Jabari Simama, was fired and four other administrators were placed on leave.

== Locations and programs ==
GPTC's primary campus is located in Clarkston, though the college also has a campus in Covington and nine centers of learning in DeKalb, Newton, and Rockdale counties. The school currently has more than 6,000 students enrolled in credit programs and more than 7,000 in adult education and continuing education classes. Academic and technical programs at GPTC cover more than 120 different occupations. There are more than 260 full-time members of the faculty and staff, and part-time faculty and staff number approximately 660.
