= Georgia Northwestern Technical College =

Six campus public college

- Motto: "Education For Work"
- Type: Public technical college
- Established: 1962
- Parent institution: Technical College System of Georgia
- President: Heidi Popham
- Students: 7,282 (fall 2024)
- Location: Catoosa County Campus/Walker County Campus/Floyd County Campus/Gordon County Campus/Polk County Campus/Whitfield-Murray Campus, Georgia, United States
- Colors: Green and Blue
- Mascot: Bobcat
- Website: www.gntc.edu

Georgia Northwestern Technical College (GNTC) is a public technical college serving nine counties across northwestern Georgia. It operates under the Technical College System of Georgia. The college has six campuses: Catoosa County campus, Walker County Campus, Floyd County Campus, Gordon County Campus, Polk County Campus, and Whitfield-Murray Campus.

Their mascot is the Bobcat.

These campuses were originally part of Coosa Valley Technical College (CVTC), begun in 1962. It was named for the Coosa River, which flows through Rome, where its main campus is located. Northwestern Technical College (NTC, formerly known as Walker Tech) is now the Walker County campus, located in Rock Spring in extreme northwest Georgia. This occurred after a 2009 merger which also affected several other TCSG schools.

== Locations ==
- Catoosa County Campus, Ringgold: 34°53′55″N 85°08′05″W
- Walker County Campus, Rock Spring: 34°48′32″N 85°14′47″W
- Floyd County Campus, Rome: 34°13′27″N 85°10′16″W
- Gordon County Campus, Calhoun: 34°29′32″N 84°58′08″W
- Polk County Campus, Rockmart: 34°01′19″N 85°02′16″W
- Whitfield-Murray Campus, Dalton: 34°46′59″N 84°55′17″W
