= Ogeechee Technical College =

Location of Statesboro and Bulloch County within the State of Georgia.

Ogeechee Technical College (OTC) is a public technical college in unincorporated Bulloch County, Georgia, with a Statesboro postal address. It is part of the Technical College System of Georgia. OTC serves Bulloch, Evans, Screven and surrounding counties. It had an enrollment of 2,300 students in fall 2024.

== History ==
State Senator Joe Kennedy was instrumental in the creation of Ogeechee Technical Institute, a post-secondary school that he hoped would educate and give job training to people in Bulloch County and the surrounding area. Ogeechee Technical Institute was created in 1987 by approval of the Georgia General Assembly. In 1989, Ogeechee Technical Institute became responsible for Adult Literacy throughout its service area. That same year, Practical Nursing, with a student body of twenty-five became the first credited program to be offered by the institute. A new facility was completed in 1990, thereby allowing the school to begin offering more classes by the spring of 1991. In the Fall of 1999, Ogeechee Tech opened three new buildings. The expansion project included a Health Sciences building, Horticulture building, and a Childcare building.

Ogeechee Technical Institute changed its name to Ogeechee Technical College in 2000. The school is ranked 14th in size among the thirty-three technical institutes within the State of Georgia. It has been under state program standards developed by The Georgia Department of Technical and Adult Education since the first day of operation.
