= Columbus Technical College =

Technical college in Columbus, Georgia, U.S.

- Type: Public community college
- Established: 1961
- President: Martha Ann Todd
- Students: 3,307 (fall 2024)
- Location: Columbus, Georgia, United States; 32°30′29″N 84°58′43″W
- Website: www.columbustech.edu

Columbus Technical College (commonly called Columbus Tech) is a public community college in Columbus, Georgia, United States. It is governed by the Technical College System of Georgia.
