= Athens Technical College =

Public college in Athens, Georgia, US

Coordinates: 33°59′22″N 83°20′23″W

- Type: Community Technical College
- Established: 1958
- President: Andrea Daniel
- Students: 4,459 (fall 2024)
- Location: Athens, Elberton, and Monroe, Georgia, United States
- Campus: Multiple Campuses
- Colors: Navy blue and Gold
- Nickname: Owls
- Website: http://www.athenstech.edu

Athens Technical College ("Athens Tech") is a unit of the Technical College System of Georgia (TCSG) in Athens, Georgia. It was founded in 1958 as Athens Area Vocational-Technical School. The school was renamed Athens Area Technical Institute in 1987 and took its current name in 2000. It offers certificates, diplomas, and associate degrees in business, health, technical, and manufacturing-related fields.

The school's administrative offices and main campus are located in Athens, with satellite campuses located in Elberton, and Monroe, Georgia. A campus in Greensboro was closed in 2023. In addition, the school also has several educational centers in the school's surrounding ten-county service area.
