= Albany Technical College =

Community college in Albany, Georgia, U.S.

Coordinates: 31°33′12.57″N 84°10′28.29″W

- Former names: Monroe Area Vocational-Technical School, Albany Area Vocational-Technical School, Albany Technical Institute
- Type: Public community college
- Established: 1961
- Parent institution: Technical College System of Georgia
- President: Emmett L. Griswold
- Students: 2,719 (fall 2024)
- Location: Albany, Georgia, United States
- Campus: Urban
- Colors: Red & black
- Nickname: Titans
- Sporting affiliations: NJCAA Division I, GCAA conference
- Website: www.albanytech.edu

Albany Technical College (Albany Tech or ATC) is a public community college in Albany, Georgia. It is part of the Technical College System of Georgia and provides education services for a seven-county service area in southwest Georgia. The school's service area includes Baker, Calhoun, Clay, Dougherty, Lee, Randolph, and Terrell counties. ATC is accredited by the Commission on Colleges of the Southern Association of Colleges and Schools to award Associate of Applied Science Degrees. The ATC Medical Assisting Program is also accredited by the Commission on Accreditation of Allied Health Education Programs (www.caahep.org) upon the recommendation of the Medical Assisting Education Review Board (MAERB).

== History ==
Albany Tech traces its roots back to the establishment of the Monroe Area Vocational-Technical School, which first opened its doors in 1961 with a class of 175 students. In 1972, Monroe Area Vocational-Technical School was merged with Albany Area Vocational-Technical School, keeping the Albany name. The school's campus was moved to its current location during the merger.

In 1988, the school was renamed Albany Technical Institute and placed under the direction of the newly formed TCSG (then-named the Department of Technical and Adult Education). Albany Tech was charged at this time with providing technical education opportunities to the residents, businesses and industries within the seven-county service delivery area it currently serves. Service Delivery Area (SDA) counties: Baker, Calhoun, Clay, Dougherty, Lee, Randolph, Terrell.

Following the passage of Georgia House Bill 1187 governing the names of units in the TCSG, Albany Technical Institute was officially renamed Albany Technical College on July 6, 2000.

== Locations ==
Albany Tech's primary campus is located at 1704 South Slappey Blvd. in Albany, Georgia. There are also adult learning centers in all seven of ATC's service delivery counties.

== Athletics ==
Albany Tech currently sponsors intercollegiate men's and women's basketball teams. The school's teams are nicknamed the Titans, and participate in Division I of the National Junior College Athletic Association (NJCAA) and the Georgia Collegiate Athletic Association (GCAA) conference.

== Notable alumni ==
- Phillip Phillips – American Idol season 11 winner
- Kylie Sonique Love – RuPaul's Drag Race season 2 and All Stars 6 competitor
