= Southeastern Technical College =

Coordinates: 32°12′14.3″N 82°21′57.1″W

- Former names: (Pre-merger: Vidalia Campus); Southeastern Technical Institute (Pre-merger: Swainsboro Campus); Swainsboro Area Vocational and Technical School; Swainsboro Technical Institute; Swainsboro Technical College
- Type: Public community college
- Established: July 1, 2009
- Parent institution: Technical College System of Georgia
- President: Larry Calhoun
- Students: 1,903 (fall 2024)
- Location: Vidalia, Georgia, United States
- Website: www.southeasterntech.edu

Southeastern Technical College (STC) is a public community college in Vidalia, Georgia with a satellite campus in Swainsboro and distance learning centers among its eight-county service area. It is part of the Technical College System of Georgia and provides vocational and adult education to students in Candler, Emanuel, Jenkins, Johnson, Montgomery, Tattnall, Toombs, and Treutlen counties.

== History ==
The current Southeastern Technical College as a legal entity was established on July 1, 2009; however, the college's history can be traced back to as early as 1963, with the establishment of the Swainsboro Area Vocational and Technical School. The institution originally served a 20-county region, the largest area served by a single vocational school in Georgia. Swainsboro Tech was governed by a local board until the formation of the Technical College System (then known as the Department of Technical and Adult education) in 1988. In the same year, Southeastern Technical College was established in Vidalia, hosting its charter class in October 1990.

=== Events leading to merger ===
In January 2008, Commissioner Ron Jackson of the Technical College System of Georgia charged a taskforce to measure the feasibility of merging two technical colleges as the first of several mergers across the state. In August 2008, a plan to merge the first two colleges was approved. At its September 2008 meeting, the State Board of Technical and Adult Education determined that merger strategies were necessary throughout the state and gave approval to proceed with the mergers proposed by the Technical College System of Georgia. Commissioner Jackson met with the Local Boards of Southeastern Technical College and Swainsboro Technical College to discuss their role during the merger process. Dr. Ray Perren, Assistant Commissioner of the TCSG, met with the college presidents to prioritize and outline the tasks before them. Southeastern and Swainsboro formed a combined Steering Committee of senior staff from both colleges to lead and manage the merger process. The Boards of Directors of Southeastern Technical College and Swainsboro Technical College held a joint meeting on January 22, 2009, in Swainsboro to discuss the merger between the two colleges. The boards voted unanimously to retain the name 'Southeastern Technical College'. The combined boards felt the name would provide the regional identity needed for the merged service area.
