= Coastal Pines Technical College =

Community college in Waycross, Georgia, US

Coordinates: 31.213755°N 82.383631°W

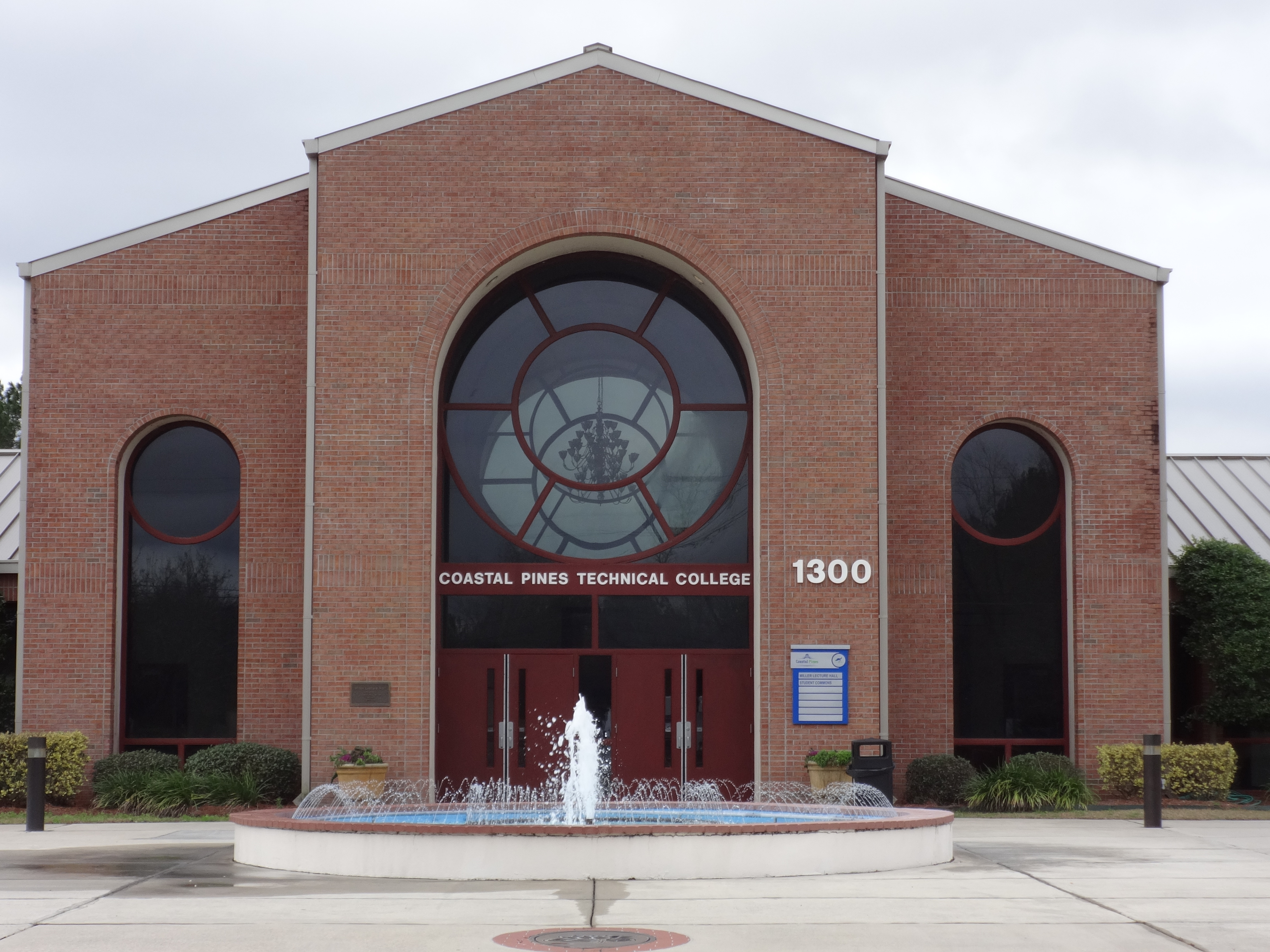
- Main campus in Waycross
- Former name: Altamaha Technical College Okefenokee Technical College
- Type: Community Technical College
- Established: July 1, 2014
- Students: 4,130 (fall 2024)
- Location: Waycross, Georgia, U.S.
- Campus: Multiple campuses
- Colors: Blue and green
- Nickname: Rays
- Website: www.coastalpines.edu

Coastal Pines Technical College (CPTC) is a community college in Waycross, Georgia, with six branches in other cities. It has a thirteen-county service delivery area (SDA), covering a total of 7,433 square miles, which is the largest SDA in the Technical College System of Georgia (TCSG). Coastal Pines has seven instructional sites in the rural towns of Alma, Baxley, Brunswick, Hazlehurst, Jesup, Kingsland and Waycross in southeastern Georgia, nineteen adult education sites and dual enrollment opportunities with sixteen high schools. The school offers over 130 programs, associate's degree, and certificate or diploma programs in the areas of allied health, business and computer, personal services, and technical and industrial technology. Students can earn a degree, diploma or certificate in as little as eight weeks to two years.

Coastal Pines Technical College offers eleven tuition-free programs through the HOPE Career Grant, as well as access to scholarships and grants through the CPTC Foundation. All remaining credit hours for the college are offered at only $89 per credit hour, making getting an education extremely affordable to the student. Coastal Pines Technical College offers programs and implements new programs that meet the demands of the work force in the service delivery area. With a 99% job placement overall, as well 94% job placement rate in the field of study, CPTC is meeting the work force demands.

Coastal Pines Technical College was established on July 1, 2014, from the merger of Altamaha Technical College (est. 1989) and Okefenokee Technical College (est. 1965). The school is a unit of the Technical College System of Georgia, which includes 28 technical colleges. The school is accredited by the Southern Association of Colleges and Schools Commission on Colleges..

The State Board of the Technical College System of Georgia (TCSG) selected Coastal Pines Technical College as the 2017 recipient of the Sonny Perdue Award for the TCSG Technical College of the Year. Coastal Pines had the highest enrollment growth at 22.1%, the highest graduation rate at 87.1%, the largest increase in High School Dual Enrollment, the Most Improvement in Operation Efficiency, and finally a Superb Licensure Pass rate (95%) for the State of Georgia.

== Photos ==
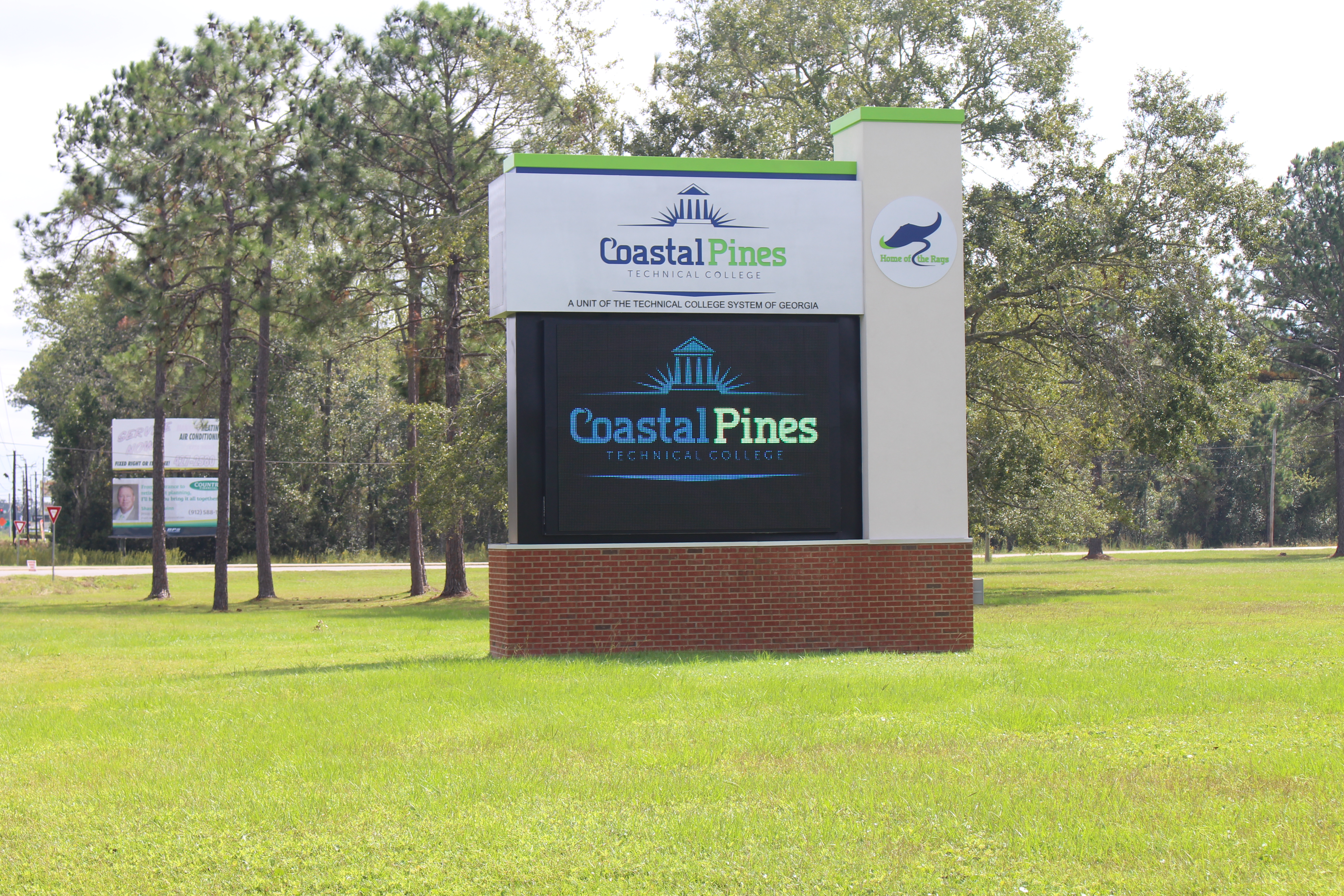
The Jesup campus

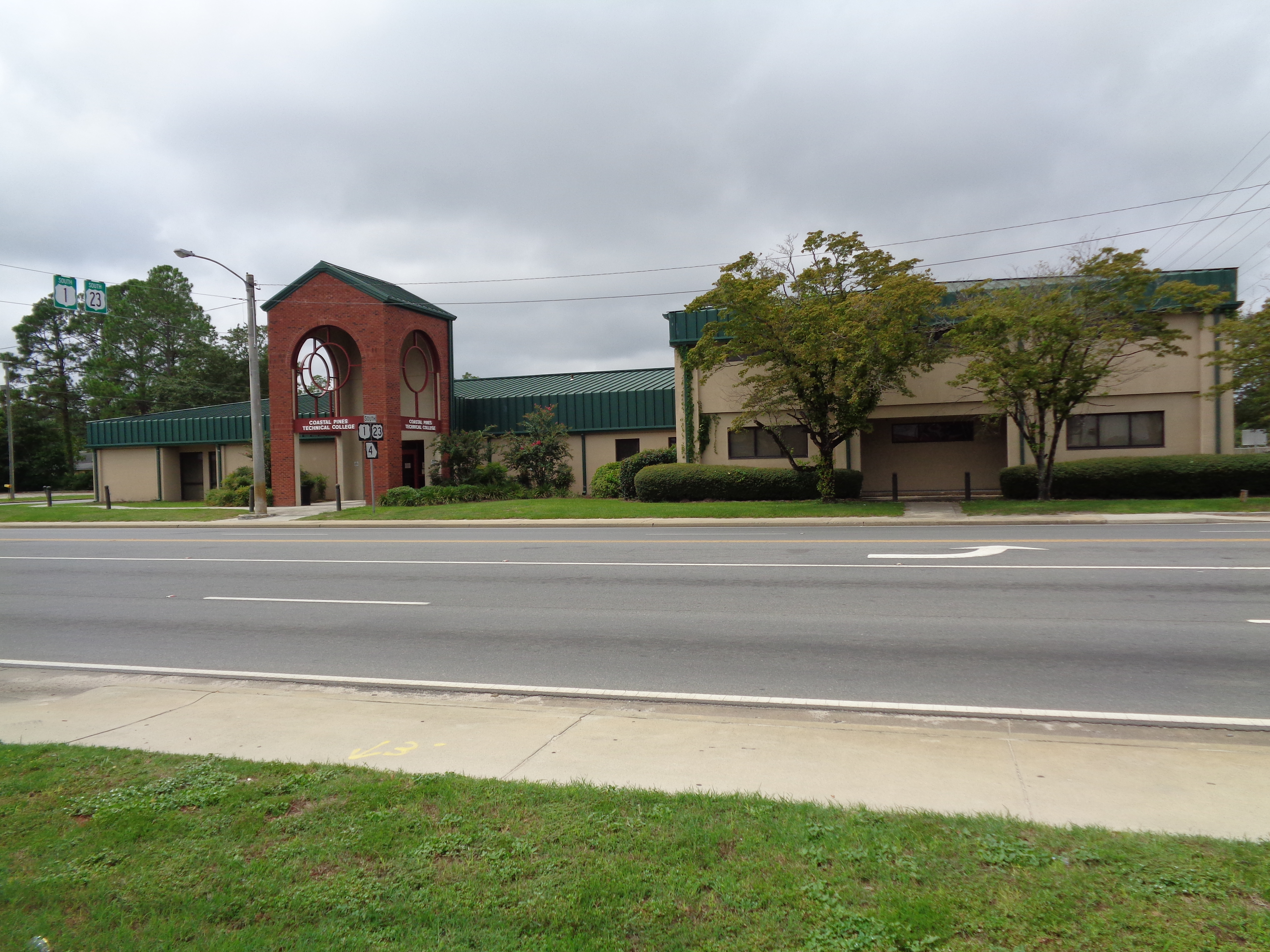
The Alma campus

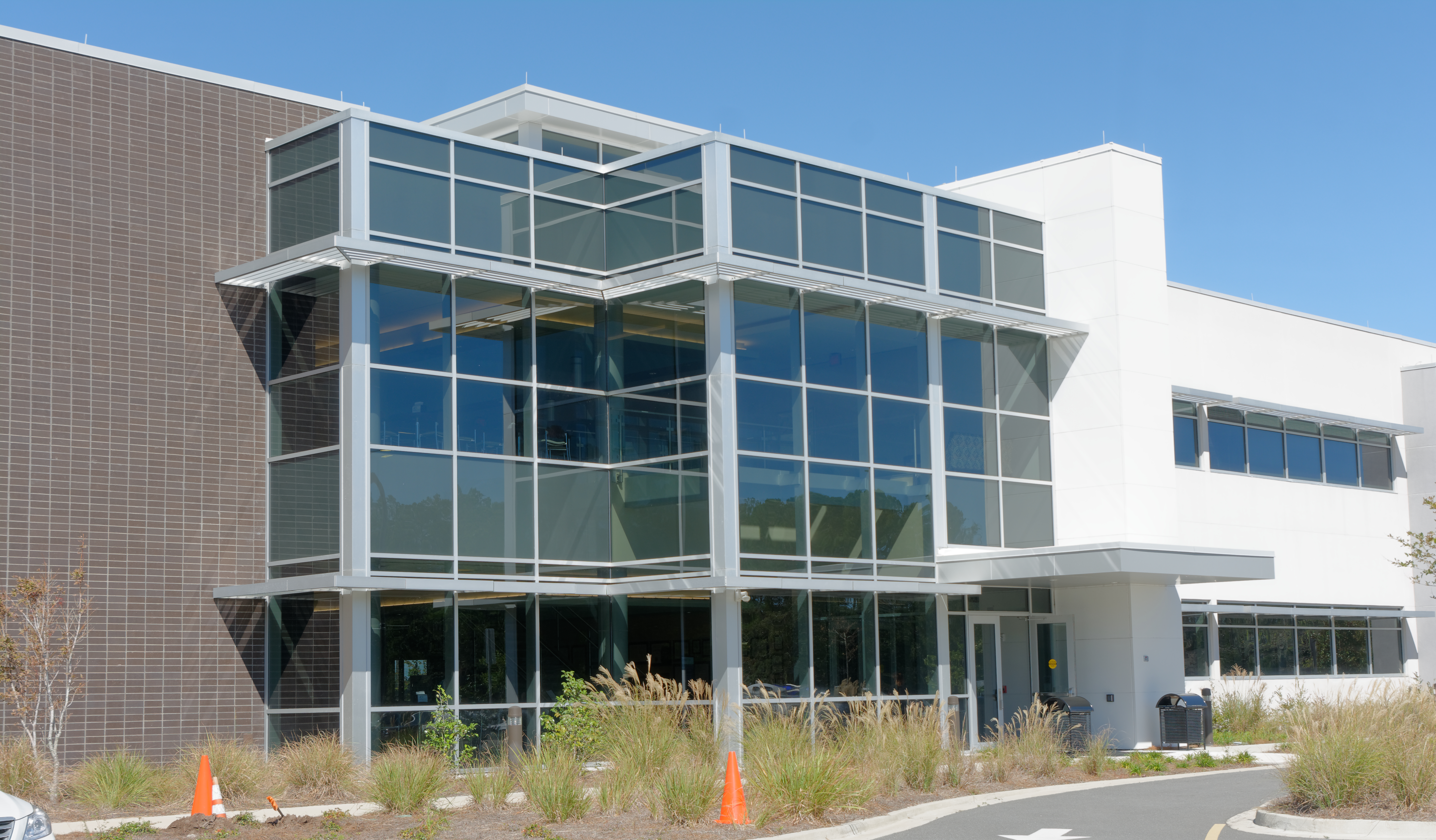
The Brunswick campus
