= Oconee Fall Line Technical College =

Community college in Dublin, Georgia

- Type: Community Technical College
- Established: July 1, 2011
- President: Erica G. Harden
- Students: 2,108 (fall 2024)
- Location: Sandersville, Georgia, USA; 32°59′53″N 82°50′8″W
- Campus: Multiple campuses.
- Colors: Green and Black
- Website: http://www.oftc.edu/

Oconee Fall Line Technical College (OFTC) is a public community college with its main campuses in Sandersville and Dublin, Georgia. It is part of the Technical College System of Georgia and provides education services for an eleven-county service area in central and eastern Georgia. The school's service area includes Bleckley, Dodge, Glascock, Hancock, Jefferson, Laurens, Telfair, Warren, Washington, Wheeler, and Wilkinson counties. OFTC is accredited by the Accrediting Commission of the Council on Occupational Education.

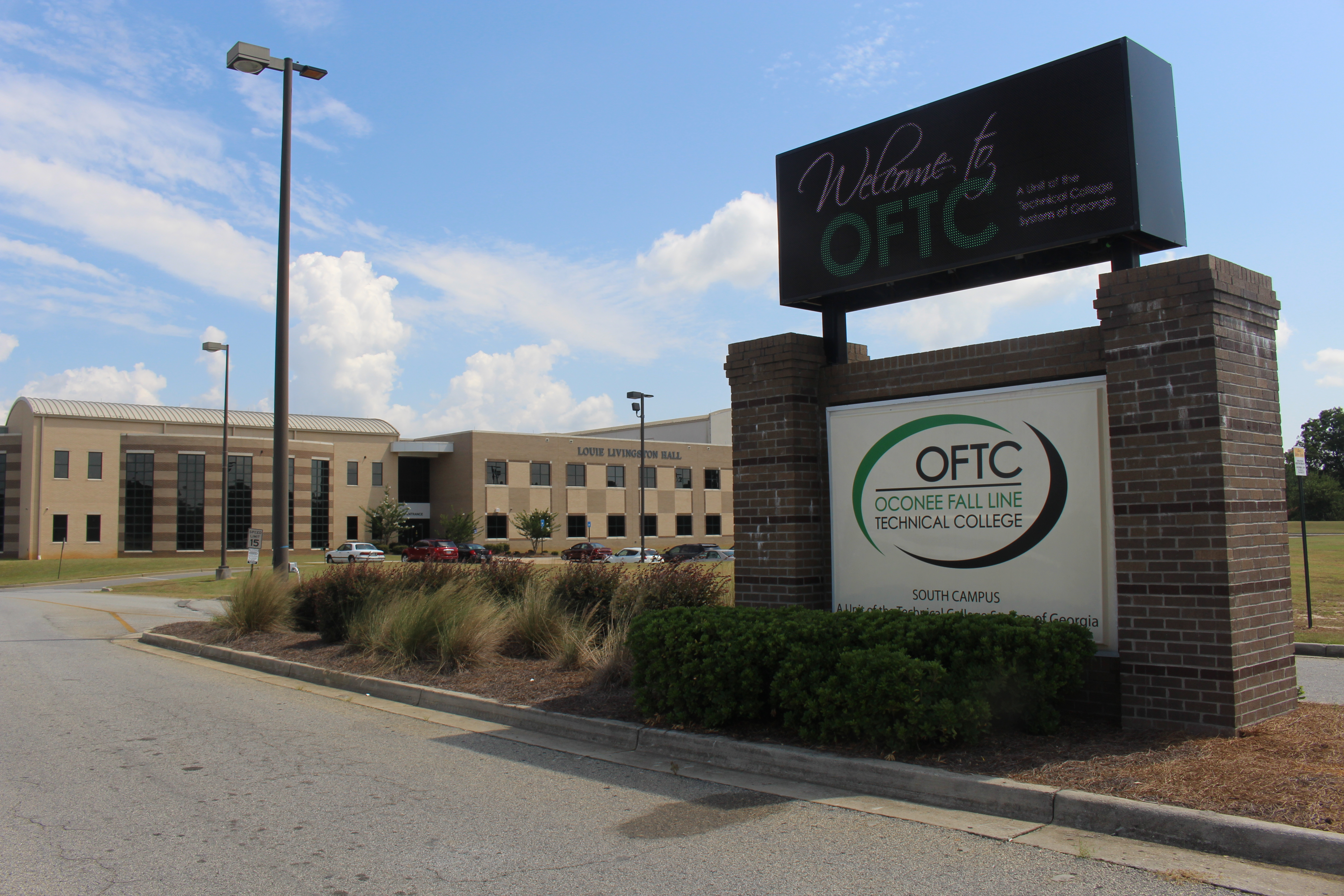

OFTC was created on July 1, 2011, as a result of the merger of Sandersville Technical College and Heart of Georgia Technical College. The merger was part of a statewide plan to reduce costs in the Technical College System of Georgia.

The school has two primary campuses, which were formerly the main campuses of its predecessor institutions. The campus in Sandersville is known as "north campus" and the campus in Dublin is known as "south campus." The school also maintains extension centers in Sparta, Louisville, Sandersville, McRae-Helena, and Eastman.
