= West Georgia Technical College =

Community college in Waco, Georgia, US

Coordinates: 32.99976°N 85.04526°W

- Former name: West Central Technical College
- Type: Public community college
- Accreditation: Southern Association of Colleges and Schools
- Academic affiliation: Technical College System of Georgia
- Students: 6,940 (fall 2024)
- Location: Carrollton, Douglasville, Franklin, Greenville, LaGrange, Newnan, and Waco, Georgia, United States
- Website: www.westgatech.edu

West Georgia Technical College (WGTC) is a public community college in Waco, Georgia. It is part of the Technical College System of Georgia and provides education for a seven-county service area that includes Carroll, Coweta, Douglas, Haralson, Heard, Meriwether, and Troup. WGTC is accredited by the Commission on Colleges of the Southern Association of Colleges and Schools (SACS) to award technical certificates of credit, and diplomas, with associate degrees being the highest level of award for which the College has been accredited.

== History ==
Western Georgia Technical College is part of the Technical College System of Georgia. It provides education for a seven-county service area that includes Carroll, Coweta, Douglas, Haralson, Heard, Meriwether, and Troup. These campuses were originally part of West Central Technical College (WCTC), based in Waco, Georgia. However, the name of the Troup campus in LaGrange was retained in the 2009 merger, one of several mergers in the TCSG.

== Campuses ==
Campuses are located in Carrollton, Newnan, Douglasville, and Waco, Georgia, respectively. Heard and Meriwether counties do not have full campuses but do have locations where classes are held. The campuses and sites include:

- Adamson Square, 401 Adamson Square, Carrollton, Georgia 30117
- Coweta Campus, 200 Campus Drive, Newnan, Georgia 30263
- Coweta-CEC Site, 160 Martin Luther King, Jr. Drive, Newnan, Georgia 30263
- Douglas Campus, 4600 Timber Ridge Drive, Douglasville, Georgia 30135
- Franklin Site, 13017 GA-34, Franklin, Georgia 30217
- Greenville Site (Workforce Development Center), 17529 Roosevelt Hightway, Greenville, Georgia 30222
- LaGrange Campus, 1 College Circle, LaGrange, Georgia 30240
- Murphy Campus, 176 Murphy Campus Blvd., Waco, Georgia 30182
- New Carroll Campus, 500 Technology Parkway, Carrollton, Georgia 30117

== Academics ==
West Georgia Technical College is accredited by the Commission on Colleges of the Southern Association of Colleges and Schools (SACS) to award technical certificates of credit, and diplomas, with associate degrees being the highest level of award for which the College has been accredited. Its offers several types of courses:

- Technical education provide individuals with one of the following awards:
  - Technical certificates of credit: typically last about six months to one year
  - Diplomas: typically last about one to one and a half years
  - degrees: typically last about two years.
- Adult education provide individuals with one of the following awards:
  - Adult Basic Education (ABE)
  - Adult Secondary Education (ASE) toward completion of the GED
  - English as a Second Language (ESL).
- Continuing education provides individuals with short-term non-credit personal and professional development and enrichment training.
  - Customized business and industry training provides employers with employer-specific training.
