= Rock Spring, Georgia =

Rock Spring
- Unincorporated community Census-designated place
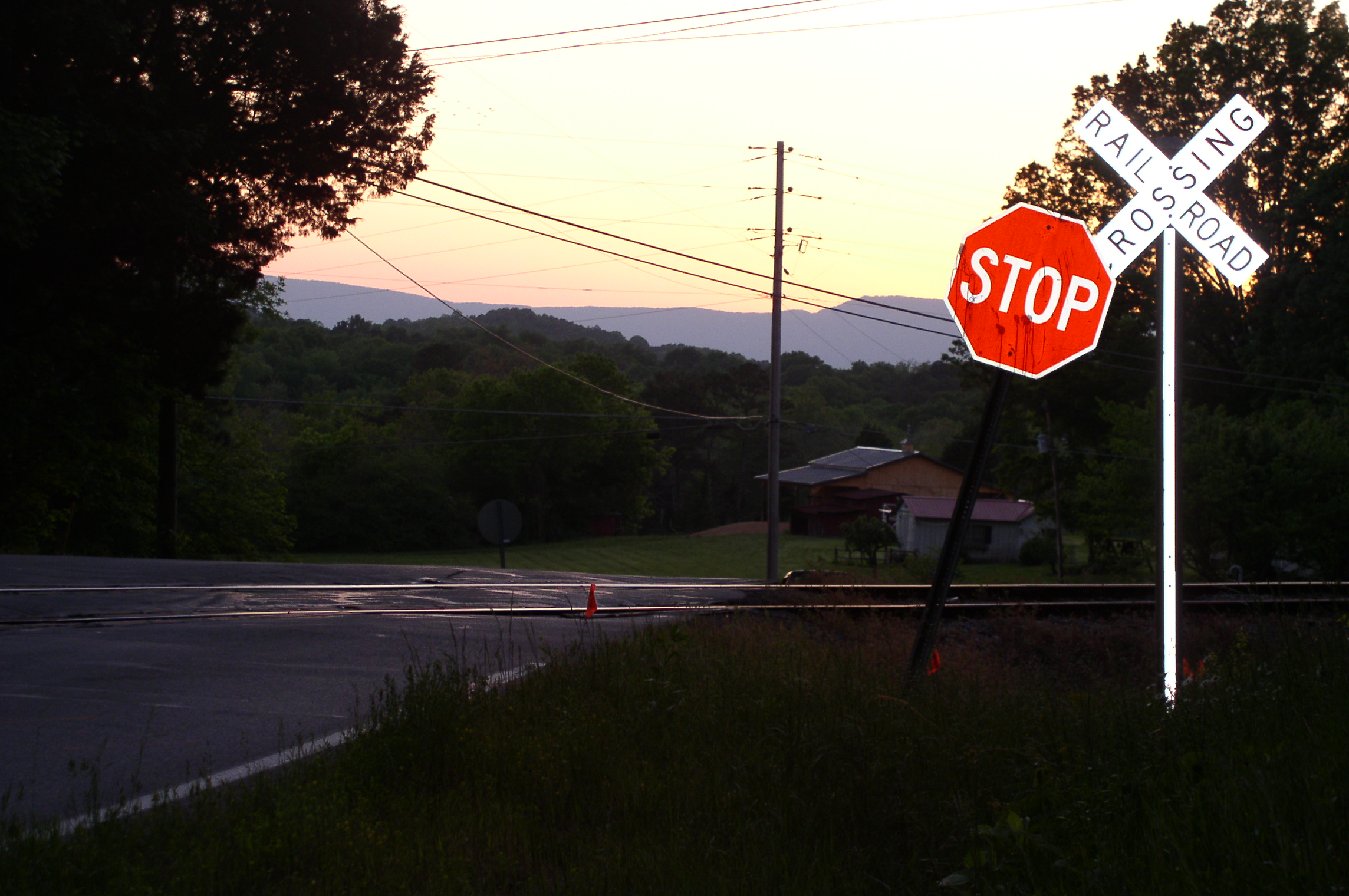
- Lookout Mountain from Rock Spring.

- Location within Georgia Location within the United States
- Coordinates: 34°48′53″N 85°14′20″W
- Country: USA
- State: Georgia
- County: Walker County
- Elevation: 263 m (863 ft)

Population (2020 Census)
  - Total: 891
- Time zone: UTC-5 (Eastern (EST))
  - Summer (DST): UTC-4 (EDT)
- GNIS feature ID: 2812702

Rock Spring is an unincorporated community and census-designated place located in northwest Georgia, United States, approximately 14 miles (23 km) south of Chattanooga, Tennessee. It is in Walker County which resides in Georgia's 14th congressional district. Rock Spring is included in the Chattanooga, TN-GA Metropolitan Statistical Area.

The 2020 Census listed a population of 891.

== Highlights ==
The nearest major city is Chattanooga, and the nearest incorporated cities are Chickamauga and La Fayette. There is a Georgia Department of Driver Services branch in the community. Rock Spring Elementary School, Saddle Ridge Elementary, and Saddle Ridge Middle School serves the community as part of the Walker County School District. Walker County has relocated its tag and tax office to a former bank building at the intersection of US 27 and Hwy 95.

== History ==
Northwest Georgia has a significant history tied to the Civil War. The Battle of Chickamauga was fought in the Chickamauga area, and was one of the major battles of the war. Chickamauga and Chattanooga National Military Park spans over 9000 acres and is located in nearby Chickamauga.

== Demographics ==
Historical population
Census	Pop.	Note	%±
2020	891		—
U.S. Decennial Census; 1850-1870 1870-1880; 1890-1910 1920-1930; 1940 1950 1960; 1970 1980 1990; 2000 2010 2020

Rock Spring was first listed as a census designated place in the 2020 U.S. census.

=== Racial and ethnic composition ===
Rock Spring CDP, Georgia – Racial and ethnic composition Note: the U.S. census treats Hispanic/Latino as an ethnic category. This table excludes Latinos from the racial categories and assigns them to a separate category. Hispanics/Latinos may be of any race.
Race / Ethnicity (NH = Non-Hispanic)	Pop 2020	% 2020
White alone (NH)	818	91.81%
Black or African American alone (NH)	14	1.57%
Native American or Alaska Native alone (NH)	0	0.00%
Asian alone (NH)	6	0.67%
Native Hawaiian or Pacific Islander alone (NH)	2	0.22%
Other race alone (NH)	7	0.79%
Mixed race or Multiracial (NH)	39	4.38%
Hispanic or Latino (any race)	5	0.56%
Total	891	100.00%
