= Southern Regional Technical College =

Community college in Thomasville, Georgia, U.S.

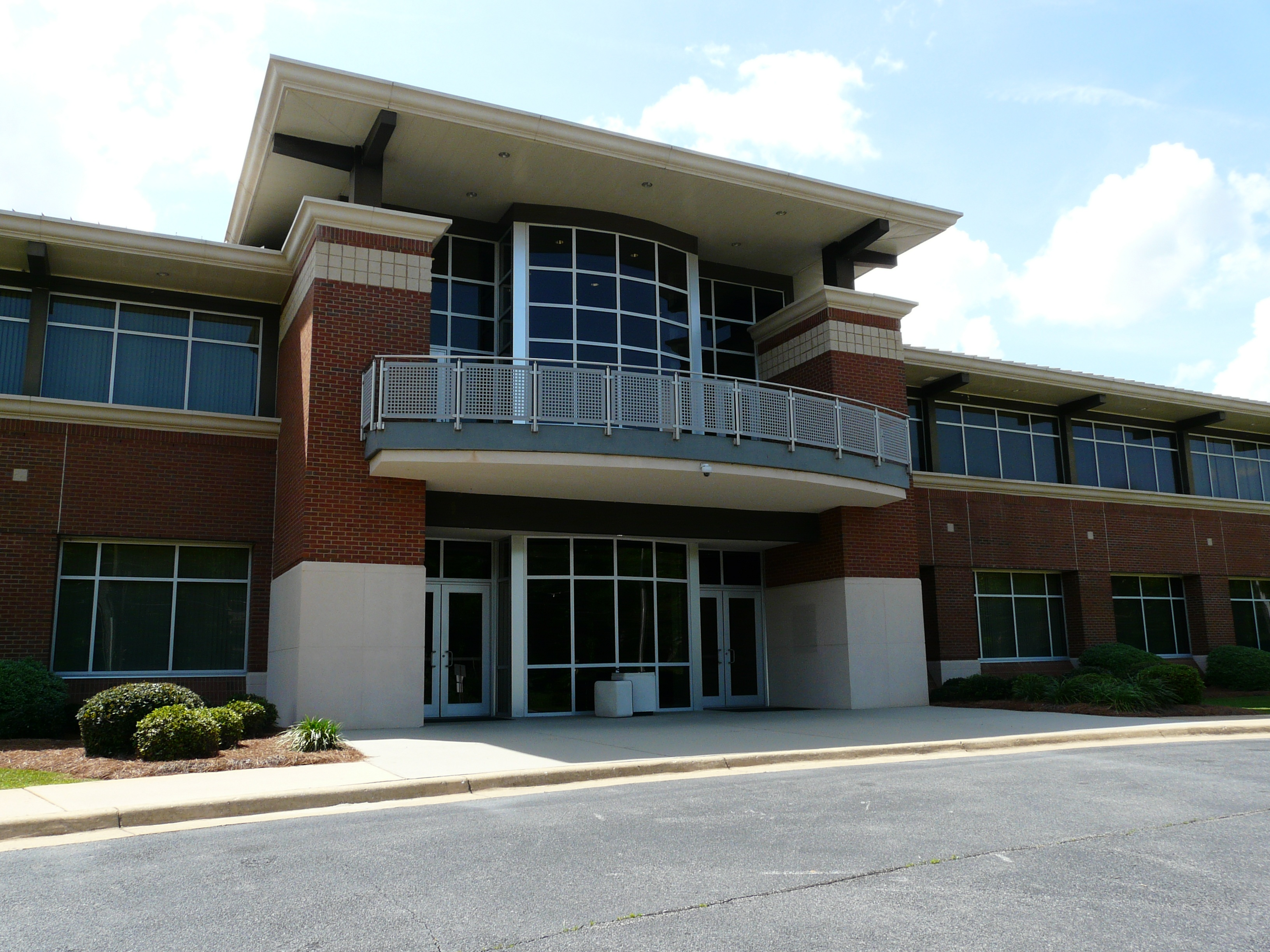
- Main campus in Thomasville, Georgia
- Type: Community Technical College
- Established: April 1, 1947
- President: Jim Glass
- Students: 5,381 (fall 2024)
- Location: Thomasville, Georgia, United States; 30°51′46.5″N 83°57′3.3″W
- Campus: Multiple campuses
- Website: southernregional.edu

Southern Regional Technical College is a public community college with its main campus in Thomasville, Georgia. It is part of the Technical College System of Georgia and provides education services for an eleven-county service area in southwest Georgia. The school was formed by the consolidation of Southwest Georgia Technical College in Thomasville and Moultrie Technical College in Moultrie in 2015, followed by the acquisition of Bainbridge State College in 2018.

The school's service area includes Colquitt, Decatur, Early, Grady, Miller, Mitchell, Seminole, Thomas, Tift, Turner, and Worth counties. SRTC is accredited by the Commission on Colleges of the Southern Association of Colleges and Schools to award associate degrees, Diplomas, and Technical Certificates of Credit. Many of the school's individual technical programs are also accredited by their respective accreditation organizations.

== Locations ==
SRTC's main campus is in Thomasville, Georgia; with other locations in Colquitt, Decatur, Early, Grady, Miller, Mitchell, Seminole, Tift, Turner, and Worth counties.
