= Index of colleges and universities in the United States =

This is an alphabetical list of articles for colleges and universities in the United States.

== A ==
- Aaniiih Nakoda College
- Abilene Christian University
- Abraham Baldwin Agricultural College
- Academy of Art University
- Academy of Vocal Arts
- Adams State University
- Adelphi University
- Adler Graduate School
- Adler University
- Adrian College
- AdventHealth University
- Agnes Scott College
- Aiken Technical College
- Aims Community College
- Alabama A&M University
- Alabama College of Osteopathic Medicine
- Alabama State University
- Alamance Community College
- Alaska Bible College
- Alaska Pacific University
- Albany College of Pharmacy and Health Sciences
- Albany Law School
- Albany Medical College
- Albany State University
- Albany Technical College
- Albertus Magnus College
- Albion College
- Albizu University
- Albright College
- Alcorn State University
- Alexandria Technical and Community College
- Alfred State College
- Alfred University
- Alice Lloyd College
- Allan Hancock College
- Allegany College of Maryland
- Allegheny College
- Allegheny Wesleyan College
- Allen College
- Allen Community College
- Allen University
- Alliance University
- Alliant International University
- Alma College
- Alpena Community College
- Alvernia University
- Alverno College
- Alvin Community College
- Amarillo College
- Amberton University
- American Baptist College
- American Heritage University of Southern California
- American InterContinental University
- American International College
- American Islamic College
- American Jewish University
- American National University
- American River College
- American Samoa Community College
- American University
- Amherst College
- Amridge University
- Ana Gonzalez Mendez University
- Anderson University (Indiana)
- Anderson University (South Carolina)
- Andrew College
- A.T. Still University
- Andrews University
- Angelina College
- Angelo State University
- Anna Maria College
- Anne Arundel Community College
- Anoka Technical College
- Anoka-Ramsey Community College
- Antelope Valley College
- Adventist University of the Antilles
- Antioch College
- Antioch University Los Angeles
- Antioch University New England
- Antioch University Santa Barbara
- Antioch University Seattle
- Appalachian Bible College
- Appalachian College of Pharmacy
- Appalachian School of Law
- Appalachian State University
- Aquinas College (Michigan)
- Aquinas College (Tennessee)
- Arapahoe Community College
- Arcadia University
- Arizona Christian University
- Arizona State University
- Arizona Western College
- Arkansas Baptist College
- Arkansas Northeastern College
- Arkansas State University
- Arkansas State University-Beebe
- Arkansas State University Mid-South
- Arkansas State University–Mountain Home
- Arkansas State University-Newport
- Arkansas State University Three Rivers
- Arkansas Tech University
- Arlington Baptist University
- Art Academy of Cincinnati
- ArtCenter College of Design
- Art Institute of Atlanta
- Asbury University
- Asheville–Buncombe Technical Community College
- Ashland Community and Technical College
- Ashland University
- Asnuntuck Community College
- Assumption College for Sisters
- Assumption University
- Athens State University
- Athens Technical College
- Atlanta Metropolitan State College
- Atlanta Technical College
- Atlanta's John Marshall Law School
- Atlantic Cape Community College
- Atlantic University College
- Atlantis University
- Auburn University
- Auburn University at Montgomery
- Augsburg University
- Augusta Technical College
- Augusta University
- Augustana College (Illinois)
- Augustana University
- Aurora University
- Austin College
- Austin Community College
- Austin Peay State University
- Ave Maria University
- Averett University
- Avila University
- Azusa Pacific University

== B ==
- Babson College
- Bacone College
- Baker College
- Baker University
- Bakersfield College
- Baldwin Wallace University
- Ball State University
- Baltimore City Community College
- Bank Street College of Education
- Baptist University of Florida
- Barber–Scotia College
- Barclay College
- Bard College
- Bard College at Simon's Rock
- Barnard College
- Barry University
- Barstow Community College
- Barton College
- Barton Community College
- Baruch College
- Bastyr University
- Bates College
- Bates Technical College
- Baton Rouge Community College
- Batten University
- Bay de Noc Community College
- Bay Mills Community College
- Bay Path University
- Bay Ridge Christian College
- Bay State College
- Bayamon Central University
- Baylor University
- Beacon College
- Beal University
- Beaufort County Community College
- Beckfield College
- Belhaven University
- Bellarmine University
- Bellevue College
- Bellevue University
- Bellin College
- Bellingham Technical College
- Belmont Abbey College
- Belmont College
- Belmont University
- Beloit College
- Bemidji State University
- Benedict College
- Benedictine College
- Benedictine University
- Benedictine University at Mesa
- Benjamin Franklin Cummings Institute of Technology
- Bennett College
- Bennington College
- Bentley University
- Berea College
- Berean Bible College
- Bergen Community College
- Berkeley City College
- Berkeley College
- Berklee College of Music
- Berkshire Community College
- Berry College
- Bethany College (Bethany, West Virginia)
- Bethany College (Lindsborg, Kansas)
- Bethany Global University
- Bethany Lutheran College
- Bethel College
- Bethel University (Arden Hills, Minnesota)
- Bethel University (McKenzie, Tennessee)
- Bethel University (Mishawaka, Indiana)
- Bethesda University
- Bethune–Cookman University
- Bevill State Community College
- Big Bend Community College
- Big Sandy Community and Technical College
- Binghamton University
- Biola University
- Birmingham School of Law
- Bishop State Community College
- Bismarck State College
- Black Hawk College
- Black Hills State University
- Black River Technical College
- Blackburn College
- Blackfeet Community College
- Blackhawk Technical College
- Bladen Community College
- Blinn College
- Blue Cliff College
- Blue Mountain Christian University
- Blue Mountain Community College
- Blue Ridge Community College (Flat Rock, North Carolina)
- Blue Ridge Community College (Weyers Cave, Virginia)
- Blue Ridge Community and Technical College
- Bluefield State University
- Bluefield University
- Bluegrass Community and Technical College
- Bluffton University
- Bob Jones University
- Boise Bible College
- Boise State University
- Bon Secours Memorial College of Nursing
- Borough of Manhattan Community College
- Bossier Parish Community College
- Boston Architectural College
- Boston Baptist College
- Boston College
- Boston Graduate School of Psychoanalysis
- Boston University
- Bowdoin College
- Bowie State University
- Bowling Green State University
- Bowling Green State University Firelands
- Boyce College
- Bradley University
- Brandeis University
- Brazosport College
- Brenau University
- Brescia University
- Brevard College
- Brewton–Parker Christian University
- Briar Cliff University
- Bridge Valley Community and Technical College
- Bridgerland Technical College
- Bridgewater College
- Bridgewater State University
- Brigham Young University
- Brigham Young University Hawai'i
- Brigham Young University Idaho
- Brightpoint Community College
- Bristol Community College
- Broadview College
- Bronx Community College
- Brookdale Community College
- Brookline College
- Brooklyn College
- Brooklyn Law School
- Broward College
- Brown University
- Brunswick Community College
- Bryan College
- Bryan University
- Bryant and Stratton College
- Bryant University
- Bryn Athyn College
- Bryn Mawr College
- Bucknell University
- Bucks County Community College
- Buena Vista University
- Buffalo State University
- Bunker Hill Community College
- Bushnell University
- Butler Community College
- Butler County Community College
- Butler University
- Butte College

== C ==
- Cabarrus College of Health Sciences
- Cabrillo College
- Cairn University
- Caldwell Community College and Technical Institute
- Caldwell University
- Calhoun Community College
- California Baptist University
- California Coast University
- California College of the Arts
- California Health Sciences University
- California Institute of the Arts
- California Institute of Integral Studies
- California Institute of Technology
- California Lutheran University
- California Miramar University
- California Polytechnic State University
- California Polytechnic State University Maritime Academy
- California Southern University
- California State Polytechnic University Humboldt
- California State Polytechnic University Pomona
- California State University Bakersfield
- California State University Channel Islands
- California State University Chico
- California State University Dominguez Hills
- California State University East Bay
- California State University Fresno
- California State University Fullerton
- California State University Long Beach
- California State University Los Angeles
- California State University Monterey Bay
- California State University Northridge
- California State University Sacramento
- California State University San Bernardino
- California State University San Marcos
- California State University Stanislaus
- California University of Management and Sciences
- California University of Management and Technology
- Calumet College of Saint Joseph
- Calvin University
- Cambridge College
- Camden County College
- Cameron University
- Campbell University
- Campbellsville University
- Canada College
- Canisius University
- Cankdeska Cikana Community College
- Cape Cod Community College
- Cape Fear Community College
- Capella University
- Capital Community College
- Capital University
- Capitol Technology University
- Cardinal Stritch University
- Caribbean University
- Carl Albert State College
- Carl Sandburg College
- Carleton College
- Carlow University
- Carnegie Mellon University
- Carolina Christian College
- Carolina College of Biblical Studies
- Carolina University
- Carolinas College of Health Sciences
- Carrington College
- Carroll College
- Carroll Community College
- Carroll University
- Carson–Newman University
- Carteret Community College
- Carthage College
- Cascadia College
- Case Western Reserve University
- Casper College
- Catawba College
- Catawba Valley Community College
- Catholic University of America
- Cayuga Community College
- Cecil College
- Cedar Crest College
- Cedarville University
- Centenary College of Louisiana
- Centenary University
- Center for Advanced Studies of Puerto Rico and the Caribbean
- Central Alabama Community College
- Central Arizona College
- Central Baptist College
- Central Carolina Community College
- Central Carolina Technical College
- Central Christian College of the Bible
- Central Christian College of Kansas
- Central College
- Central Connecticut State University
- Central Georgia Technical College
- Central Lakes College
- Central Maine Community College
- Central Methodist University
- Central Michigan University
- Central New Mexico Community College
- Central Ohio Technical College
- Central Oregon Community College
- Central Pennsylvania College
- Central Pennsylvania Institute of Science and Technology
- Central Piedmont Community College
- Central State University
- Central Texas College
- Central University of the Caribbean
- Central Virginia Community College
- Central Washington University
- Central Washington University Lynnwood
- Central Wyoming College
- Centralia College
- Centre College
- Century College
- Cerritos College
- Cerro Coso Community College
- Chabot College
- Chadron State College
- Chaffey College
- Chamberlain University
- Chaminade University of Honolulu
- Champlain College
- Chandler–Gilbert Community College
- Chapman University
- Charles Richard Drew University of Medicine and Science
- Charles Stewart Mott Community College
- Charleston School of Law
- Charleston Southern University
- Charlotte Christian College and Theological Seminary
- Charter Oak State College
- Chatham University
- Chattahoochee Technical College
- Chattahoochee Valley Community College
- Chattanooga State Community College
- Chemeketa Community College
- Chesapeake College
- Chestnut Hill College
- Cheyney University of Pennsylvania
- Chicago School
- Chicago State University
- Chief Dull Knife College
- Chipola College
- Chippewa Valley Technical College
- Chowan University
- Christendom College
- Christian Brothers University
- Christian College of Georgia
- Christopher Newport University
- Cincinnati State Technical and Community College
- Cisco College
- Citadel Military College of South Carolina
- Citrus College
- City College
- City College of New York
- City College of San Francisco
- City University of New York Graduate Center
- City University of New York Graduate School of Public Health and Health Policy
- City University of New York School of Labor and Urban Studies
- City University of New York School of Law
- City University of New York School of Professional Studies
- City University of Seattle
- Clackamas Community College
- Claflin University
- Claremont Graduate University
- Claremont Lincoln University
- Claremont McKenna College
- Clark Atlanta University
- Clark College
- Clark State College
- Clark University
- Clarke University
- Clarks Summit University
- Clarkson College
- Clarkson University
- Clatsop Community College
- Clayton State University
- Clear Creek Baptist Bible College
- Cleary University
- Clemson University
- Cleveland Community College
- Cleveland Institute of Art
- Cleveland Institute of Music
- Cleveland State Community College
- Cleveland State University
- Cleveland University Kansas City
- Clinton College
- Clinton Community College
- Cloud County Community College
- Clover Park Technical College
- Clovis Community College (Clovis, New Mexico)
- Clovis Community College (Fresno, California)
- Coahoma Community College
- Coastal Carolina Community College
- Coastal Alabama Community College
- Coastal Bend College
- Coastal Carolina University
- Coastal Pines Technical College
- Coastline Community College
- Cochise College
- Coconino Community College
- Coe College
- Coffeyville Community College
- Coker University
- Colby College
- Colby Community College
- Colby–Sawyer College
- Cold Spring Harbor Laboratory
- Colgate University
- College of Alameda
- College of The Albemarle
- College of the Atlantic
- College of Business and Technology
- College of the Canyons
- College of Central Florida
- College of Charleston
- College of Coastal Georgia
- College for Creative Studies
- College of the Desert
- College of DuPage
- College of Eastern Idaho
- College of the Florida Keys
- College of Health Care Professions
- College of the Holy Cross
- College of Idaho
- College of Lake County
- College of the Mainland
- College of Marin
- College of Menominee Nation
- College of the Muscogee Nation
- College of New Jersey
- College of Our Lady of the Elms
- College of the Ozarks
- College of the Redwoods
- College of Saint Benedict
- College of Saint Mary
- College of Saint Rose
- College of Saint Scholastica
- College of San Mateo
- College of the Sequoias
- College of the Siskiyous
- College of Southern Idaho
- College of Southern Maryland
- College of Southern Nevada
- College of Staten Island
- College of Westchester
- College of Western Idaho
- College of William & Mary
- College of Wooster
- Collin College
- Colorado Christian University
- Colorado College
- Colorado Mesa University
- Colorado Mountain College
- Colorado Northwestern Community College
- Colorado School of Mines
- Colorado State University
- Colorado State University Pueblo
- Colorado Technical University
- Columbia Basin College
- Columbia College (Columbia, Missouri)
- Columbia College (Columbia, South Carolina)
- Columbia College (Sonora, California)
- Columbia College Chicago
- Columbia Gorge Community College
- Columbia International University
- Columbia Southern University
- Columbia State Community College
- Columbia University
- Columbia–Greene Community College
- Columbus College of Art and Design
- Columbus State Community College
- Columbus State University
- Columbus Technical College
- Commonwealth University-Bloomsburg
- Commonwealth University-Lock Haven
- Commonwealth University-Mansfield
- Community College of Allegheny County
- Community College of Aurora
- Community College of Baltimore County
- Community College of Beaver County
- Community College of Denver
- Community College of Philadelphia
- Community College of Rhode Island
- Compton College
- Concord University
- Concordia College
- Concordia University Ann Arbor
- Concordia University Chicago
- Concordia University Irvine
- Concordia University Nebraska
- Concordia University Saint Paul
- Concordia University Texas
- Concordia University Wisconsin
- Connecticut College
- Connors State College
- Contra Costa College
- Converse University
- Conway School of Landscape Design
- Cooley Law School
- Cooper Union for the Advancement of Science and Art
- Copiah–Lincoln Community College
- Copper Mountain College
- Coppin State University
- Corban University
- Cornell College
- Cornell University
- Cornerstone University
- Cornish College of the Arts
- Cossatot Community College of the University of Arkansas
- Cosumnes River College
- Cottey College
- County College of Morris
- Covenant College
- Cowley Community College
- Cox College
- Crafton Hills College
- Craig Newmark Graduate School of Journalism
- Craven Community College
- Creighton University
- Criswell College
- Crossroads Bible College
- Crowder College
- Crowley's Ridge College
- Crown College (Powell, Tennessee)
- Crown College (Saint Bonifacius, Minnesota)
- Cuesta College
- Culinary Institute of America
- Culver–Stockton College
- Cumberland University
- Curry College
- Curtis Institute of Music
- Cuyahoga Community College
- Cuyamaca College
- Cypress College

== D ==
- Daemen University
- Dakota College at Bottineau
- Dakota County Technical College
- Dakota State University
- Dakota Wesleyan University
- Dallas Baptist University
- Dallas Christian College
- Dallas College
- Dallas International University
- Dalton State College
- Danville Area Community College
- Danville Community College
- Dartmouth College
- Davenport University
- Davidson College
- Davidson–Davie Community College
- Davis College
- Davis and Elkins College
- Davis Technical College
- Dawson Community College
- Daytona State College
- De Anza College
- Dean College
- Deep Springs College
- Defense Language Institute
- Defiance College
- Del Mar College
- Delaware County Community College
- Delaware State University
- Delaware Technical Community College
- Delaware Valley University
- Delgado Community College
- Delta College
- Delta State University
- Delta Technical College
- Denison University
- Denmark Technical College
- DePaul University
- DePauw University
- Des Moines Area Community College
- Des Moines University
- DeSales University
- Desert Research Institute
- Dharma Realm Buddhist University
- Diablo Valley College
- Dickinson College
- Dickinson State University
- Dillard University
- Dine College
- Divine Mercy University
- Divine Word College
- Dixie Technical College
- Doane University
- Dodge City Community College
- Dominican University
- Dominican University of California
- Dominican University New York
- Dona Ana Community College
- Donnelly College
- Dordt University
- Downstate Health Sciences University
- Drake University
- Drew University
- Drexel University
- Drury University
- Duke University
- Dunwoody College of Technology
- Duquesne University of the Holy Spirit
- Durham Technical Community College
- Dutchess Community College
- Dyersburg State Community College
- D'Youville University

== E ==
- Eagle Gate College
- Earlham College
- East Arkansas Community College
- East Carolina University
- East Central College
- East Central Community College
- East Central University
- East Coast Polytechnic Institute
- East Georgia State College
- East Los Angeles College
- East Mississippi Community College
- East Stroudsburg University of Pennsylvania
- East Tennessee State University
- East Texas Agricultural and Mechanical University
- East Texas Baptist University
- East West College of Natural Medicine
- East–West University
- Eastern Arizona College
- Eastern Connecticut State University
- Eastern Florida State College
- Eastern Gateway Community College
- Eastern Illinois University
- Eastern Kentucky University
- Eastern Maine Community College
- Eastern Mennonite University
- Eastern Michigan University
- Eastern New Mexico University
- Eastern Oklahoma State College
- Eastern Oregon University
- Eastern Shore Community College
- Eastern University
- Eastern Virginia Medical School
- Eastern Washington University
- Eastern West Virginia Community and Technical College
- Eastern Wyoming College
- Ecclesia College
- Eckerd College
- Edgecombe Community College
- Edgewood University
- Edison State Community College
- Edmonds College
- Edward Waters University
- El Camino College
- El Paso Community College
- Elgin Community College
- Elizabeth City State University
- Elizabethtown College
- Elizabethtown Community and Technical College
- Ellsworth Community College
- Elmhurst University
- Elmira College
- Elon University
- Embry–Riddle Aeronautical University Daytona Beach
- Embry–Riddle Aeronautical University Prescott
- Emerson College
- Emmanuel College
- Emmanuel University
- Emmaus Baptist College
- Emmaus University
- Emory and Henry University
- Emory University
- Emperor's College of Traditional Oriental Medicine
- Empire State University
- Emporia State University
- Endicott College
- Ensign College
- Enterprise State Community College
- Epic Bible College
- Erikson Institute
- Erskine College
- Essex County College
- Estrella Mountain Community College
- Eureka College
- Evangel University
- Everett Community College
- Everglades University
- Evergreen State College
- Evergreen Valley College

== F ==
- Fairfield University
- Fairleigh Dickinson University
- Fairmont State University
- Faith International University and Seminary
- Farmingdale State College
- Fashion Institute of Design and Merchandising
- Fashion Institute of Technology
- Faulkner University
- Fayetteville State University
- Fayetteville Technical Community College
- Feather River College
- Felician University
- Ferris State University
- Ferrum College
- Fielding Graduate University
- Finger Lakes Community College
- Fisher College
- Fisk University
- Fitchburg State University
- Five Towns College
- Flagler College
- Flathead Valley Community College
- Fletcher Technical Community College
- Flint Hills Technical College
- Florence–Darlington Technical College
- Florida Agricultural and Mechanical University
- Florida Atlantic University
- Florida College
- Florida Gateway College
- Florida Gulf Coast University
- Florida Institute of Technology
- Florida International University
- Florida Memorial University
- Florida National University
- Florida Polytechnic University
- Florida Southern College
- Florida SouthWestern State College
- Florida State College at Jacksonville
- Florida State University
- Florida Technical College
- Folsom Lake College
- Fond du Lac Tribal and Community College
- Foothill College
- Fordham University
- Forsyth Technical Community College
- Fort Hays State University
- Fort Lewis College
- Fort Peck Community College
- Fort Scott Community College
- Fort Valley State University
- Fortis College
- Fox College
- Fox Valley Technical College
- Framingham State University
- Francis Marion University
- Franciscan Missionaries of Our Lady University
- Franciscan University of Steubenville
- Frank Phillips College
- Franklin College
- Franklin and Marshall College
- Franklin Pierce University
- Franklin University
- Frederick Community College
- Freed–Hardeman University
- Fresno City College
- Fresno Pacific University
- Friends University
- Front Range Community College
- Frontier Community College
- Frontier Nursing University
- Frostburg State University
- Full Sail University
- Fullerton College
- Fulton–Montgomery Community College
- Furman University

== G ==
- Gadsden State Community College
- Gallaudet University
- Galveston College
- Gannon University
- Garden City Community College
- Gardner–Webb University
- Garrett College
- Gaston College
- Gateway Community College (New Haven, Connecticut)
- GateWay Community College (Phoenix, Arizona)
- Gateway Community and Technical College
- Gateway Technical College
- Gavilan College
- Geisinger Commonwealth School of Medicine
- Generations College
- Geneva College
- George Fox University
- George Mason University
- George Washington University
- Georgetown College
- Georgetown University
- Georgia College and State University
- Georgia Gwinnett College
- Georgia Highlands College
- Georgia Institute of Technology
- Georgia Military College
- Georgia Northwestern Technical College
- Georgia Piedmont Technical College
- Georgia Southern University
- Georgia Southwestern State University
- Georgia State University
- Georgian Court University
- Germanna Community College
- Gettysburg College
- Gillette College
- Glen Oaks Community College
- Glendale Community College (Glendale, Arizona)
- Glendale Community College (Glendale, California)
- Glenville State University
- Global University
- Goddard College
- Gogebic Community College
- Golden Gate University
- Golden West College
- Goldey–Beacom College
- Gonzaga University
- Goodwin University
- Gordon College
- Gordon State College
- Goshen College
- Goucher College
- Governors State University
- Grace Christian University
- Grace College and Seminary
- Graceland University
- Grambling State University
- Grand Canyon University
- Grand Rapids Community College
- Grand Valley State University
- Grand View University
- Gratz College
- Grays Harbor College
- Great Basin College
- Great Bay Community College
- Great Falls College
- Great Lakes Christian College
- Green River College
- Greenfield Community College
- Greensboro College
- Greenville Technical College
- Greenville University
- Grinnell College
- Grossmont College
- Grove City College
- Guam Community College
- Guilford College
- Guilford Technical Community College
- Gulf Coast State College
- Gurnick Academy
- Gustavus Adolphus College
- Gutenberg College
- Guttman Community College
- Gwinnett College
- Gwinnett Technical College
- Gwynedd Mercy University

== H ==
- Hagerstown Community College
- Halifax Community College
- Hallmark University
- Hamilton College
- Hamline University
- Hampden–Sydney College
- Hampshire College
- Hampton University
- Hannibal–LaGrange University
- Hanover College
- Harcum College
- Harding University
- Hardin–Simmons University
- Harford Community College
- Harold Washington College
- Harper College
- Harper Councill Trenholm State Community College
- Harrisburg Area Community College
- Harrisburg University of Science and Technology
- Harris–Stowe State University
- Harry Truman College
- Hartford International University for Religion and Peace
- Hartnell College
- Hartwick College
- Harvard University
- Harvey Mudd College
- Haskell Indian Nations University
- Hastings College
- Haverford College
- Hawai'i Community College
- Hawai'i Pacific University
- Hawai'i Tokai International College
- Hawkeye Community College
- Haywood Community College
- Hazard Community and Technical College
- Heartland Baptist Bible College
- Heartland Community College
- Hebrew College
- Hebrew Union College Jewish Institute of Religion
- Heidelberg University
- Helena College
- Helene Fuld College of Nursing
- Hellenic American University
- Henderson Community College
- Henderson State University
- Hendrix College
- Hennepin Technical College
- Henry Ford College
- Herzing University
- Heritage Christian University
- Heritage University
- Herkimer County Community College
- Hesston College
- High Point University
- Highland Community College (Freeport, Illinois)
- Highland Community College (Highland, Kansas)
- Highline College
- Hilbert College
- Hill College
- Hillsborough Community College
- Hillsdale College
- Hinds Community College
- Hiram College
- Hobart College
- Hobe Sound Bible College
- Hocking College
- Hofstra University
- Hollins University
- Holy Cross College
- Holy Family University
- Holyoke Community College
- Honolulu Community College
- Hood College
- Hope College
- Hope International University
- Hopkinsville Community College
- Horry–Georgetown Technical College
- Hostos Community College
- Houghton University
- Housatonic Community College
- Houston Christian University
- Houston Community College
- Howard College
- Howard Community College
- Howard Payne University
- Howard University
- Hudson County Community College
- Hudson Valley Community College
- Hult International Business School
- Humphreys University
- Hunter College
- Huntingdon College
- Huntington Junior College
- Huntington University
- Huntsville Bible College
- Husson University
- Huston–Tillotson University
- Hutchinson Community College

== I ==
- Icahn School of Medicine at Mount Sinai
- Idaho College of Osteopathic Medicine
- Idaho State University
- Ilisagvik College
- Illinois Central College
- Illinois College
- Illinois College of Optometry
- Illinois Institute of Technology
- Illinois State University
- Illinois Valley Community College
- Illinois Wesleyan University
- Immaculata University
- Imperial Valley College
- Independence Community College
- Indian Hills Community College
- Indian River State College
- Indiana Institute of Technology
- Indiana State University
- Indiana University Bloomington
- Indiana University Columbus
- Indiana University East
- Indiana University Fort Wayne
- Indiana University Indianapolis
- Indiana University Kokomo
- Indiana University Northwest
- Indiana University South Bend
- Indiana University Southeast
- Indiana University of Pennsylvania
- Indiana Wesleyan University
- Institute of American Indian Arts
- Institute of Buddhist Studies
- Institute for Clinical Acupuncture and Oriental Medicine
- Institute for Doctoral Studies in the Visual Arts
- Institute of World Politics
- Inter–American Defense College
- Interamerican University of Puerto Rico
- Interamerican University of Puerto Rico at Ponce
- International Business College
- International Institute for Restorative Practices
- International Technological University
- Inver Hills Community College
- Iona University
- Iowa Central Community College
- Iowa Lakes Community College
- Iowa State University
- Iowa Wesleyan University
- Iowa Western Community College
- Irvine Valley College
- Isothermal Community College
- Itawamba Community College
- Ithaca College
- Ivy Technical Community College of Indiana

== J ==
- Jackson College
- Jackson State Community College
- Jackson State University
- Jacksonville College
- Jacksonville State University
- Jacksonville University
- James Allen Rhodes State College
- James Madison University
- James Sprunt Community College
- Jamestown Community College
- Jarvis Christian University
- Jefferson College
- Jefferson College of Health Sciences
- Jefferson Community and Technical College
- Jefferson State Community College
- Jersey College
- Jessup University
- John Alexander Logan College
- John Brown University
- John Carroll University
- John Fred Ingram State Technical College
- John Gupton College
- John Jay College of Criminal Justice
- John Paul the Great Catholic University
- John Witherspoon College
- John Wood Community College
- Johns Hopkins University
- Johnson College
- Johnson County Community College
- Johnson Crayne Smith University
- Johnson University
- Johnson University Florida
- Johnson and Wales University
- Johnston Community College
- Joliet Junior College
- Jones County Junior College
- Joseph Fanning Drake State Community and Technical College
- Judson University
- Juilliard School
- Julian Sargeant Reynolds Community College
- Juniata College

== K ==
- Kalamazoo College
- Kalamazoo Valley Community College
- Kankakee Community College
- Kansas Christian College
- Kansas City Art Institute
- Kansas City Kansas Community College
- Kansas City University
- Kansas Health Science Center Kansas College of Osteopathic Medicine
- Kansas State University
- Kansas Wesleyan University
- Kapi'olani Community College
- Kaskaskia College
- Kaua'i Community College
- Kean Jersey City
- Kean University
- Keck Graduate Institute
- Keene State College
- Keiser University
- Kellogg Community College
- Kenai Peninsula College
- Kennebec Valley Community College
- Kennedy–King College
- Kennesaw State University
- Kent State University
- Kent State University at Ashtabula
- Kent State University at East Liverpool
- Kent State University at Salem
- Kent State University at Stark
- Kentucky Christian University
- Kentucky Mountain Bible College
- Kentucky State University
- Kentucky Wesleyan College
- Kenyon College
- Kettering College
- Kettering University
- Keuka College
- Keweenaw Bay Ojibwa Community College
- Keystone College
- Kilgore College
- King University
- King's College
- King's University
- Kingsborough Community College
- Kirkwood Community College
- Kirtland Community College
- Kishwaukee College
- Knox College
- Knoxville College
- Kodiak College
- Kutztown University of Pennsylvania
- Kuyper College

== L ==
- La Roche University
- La Salle University
- La Sierra University
- Labette Community College
- Laboratory Institute of Merchandising College
- Laboure College
- Lac Courte Oreilles Ojibwa University
- Lackawanna College
- Lafayette College
- LaGrange College
- LaGuardia Community College
- Laguna College of Art and Design
- Lake Area Technical College
- Lake Erie College
- Lake Forest College
- Lake Land College
- Lake Michigan College
- Lake Region State College
- Lake Superior College
- Lake Superior State University
- Lake Tahoe Community College
- Lake Washington Institute of Technology
- Lakeland Community College
- Lakes Region Community College
- Lakeshore Technical College
- Lake–Sumter State College
- Lakeview College of Nursing
- Lamar Community College
- Lamar Institute of Technology
- Lamar State College Orange
- Lamar State College Port Arthur
- Lamar University
- Lancaster Bible College
- Lander University
- Landmark College
- Lane College
- Lane Community College
- Laney College
- Langston University
- Lanier Technical College
- Lansing Community College
- Laramie County Community College
- Laredo College
- Las Positas College
- Lasell University
- Lassen Community College
- Laurel Ridge Community College
- Lawrence Technological University
- Lawrence University
- Lawson State Community College
- Le Moyne College
- Lebanon Valley College
- Lee College
- Lee University
- Lees–McRae College
- Leeward Community College
- Lehigh Carbon Community College
- Lehigh University
- Lehman College
- LeMoyne–Owen College
- Lenoir Community College
- Lenoir–Rhyne University
- Lesley University
- LeTourneau University
- Lewis and Clark College
- Lewis and Clark Community College
- Lewis University
- Lewis–Clark State College
- Liberty University
- Life Pacific University
- Life University
- Limestone University
- Lincoln Christian University
- Lincoln Land Community College
- Lincoln Memorial University
- Lincoln Trail College
- Lincoln University (Jefferson City, Missouri)
- Lincoln University (Oakland, California)
- Lincoln University (Oxford, Pennsylvania)
- Lindenwood University
- Lindsey Wilson University
- Linfield University
- Linn–Benton Community College
- Lipscomb University
- Little Big Horn College
- Livingstone College
- Logan University
- Loma Linda University
- Lone Star College CyFair
- Lone Star College Kingwood
- Lone Star College Montgomery
- Lone Star College North Harris
- Lone Star College Tomball
- Lone Star College University Park
- Long Beach City College
- Long Island University Brooklyn
- Long Island University Post
- Longwood University
- Longy School of Music
- Lorain County Community College
- Loras College
- Los Angeles City College
- Los Angeles College of Music
- Los Angeles Harbor College
- Los Angeles Mission College
- Los Angeles Pierce College
- Los Angeles Southwest College
- Los Angeles Trade–Technical College
- Los Angeles Valley College
- Los Medanos College
- Louisiana Christian University
- Louisiana Delta Community College
- Louisiana State University
- Louisiana State University of Alexandria
- Louisiana State University at Eunice
- Louisiana State University New Orleans
- Louisiana State University Shreveport
- Louisiana Tech University
- Louisville Bible College
- Lourdes University
- Lower Columbia College
- Loyola Marymount University
- Loyola University Chicago
- Loyola University Maryland
- Loyola University New Orleans
- Lubbock Christian University
- Luna Community College
- Lurleen Burns Wallace Community College
- Luther College
- Luther Rice College and Seminary
- Luzerne County Community College
- Lycoming College
- Lynn University
- Lyon College

== M ==
- Macalester College
- Macaulay Honors College
- Macomb Community College
- Madison Area Technical College
- Madisonville Community College
- Madonna University
- Maharishi International University
- Maine College of Art and Design
- Maine College of Health Professions
- Maine Maritime Academy
- Maine Media College
- Malcolm X College
- Malone University
- Manchester Community College (Manchester, Connecticut)
- Manchester Community College (Manchester, New Hampshire)
- Manchester University
- Manhattan Area Technical College
- Manhattan Christian College
- Manhattan School of Music
- Manhattan University
- Manhattanville University
- Manor College
- Maranatha Baptist University
- Marian University (Fond du Lac, Wisconsin)
- Marian University (Indianapolis, Indiana)
- Marietta College
- Marion Military Institute
- Marion Technical College
- Marist University
- Maritime College
- Marquette University
- Mars Hill University
- Marshall University
- Marshalltown Community College
- Martin Community College
- Martin Luther College
- Martin University
- Mary Baldwin University
- Maryland Institute College of Art
- Maryland University of Integrative Health
- Marymount Manhattan College
- Marymount University
- Maryville College
- Maryville University
- Marywood University
- Massachusetts Bay Community College
- Massachusetts College of Art and Design
- Massachusetts College of Liberal Arts
- Massachusetts College of Pharmacy and Health Sciences
- Massachusetts Institute of Technology
- Massachusetts Maritime Academy
- Massachusetts School of Law
- Massasoit Community College
- Master's University
- Matanuska–Susitna College
- Mayland Community College
- Mayo Clinic College of Medicine and Science
- Maysville Community and Technical College
- Mayville State University
- McCall College
- McCann School of Business and Technology
- McDaniel College
- McDowell Technical Community College
- McHenry County College
- McKendree University
- McLennan Community College
- McMurry University
- McNeese State University
- McPherson College
- Medgar Evers College
- Medical College of Wisconsin
- Medical University of South Carolina
- Meharry Medical College
- Mendocino College
- Menlo College
- Merced College
- Mercer County Community College
- Mercer University
- Mercy College of Health Sciences
- Mercy College of Ohio
- Mercy University
- Mercyhurst University
- Meredith College
- Meridian Community College
- Merrimack College
- Merritt College
- Mesa Community College
- Mesalands Community College
- Messiah University
- Methodist College
- Methodist University
- Metropolitan College of New York
- Metropolitan Community College
- Metropolitan State University
- Metropolitan State University of Denver
- Miami Dade College
- Miami International University of Art and Design
- Miami–Jacobs Career College
- Miami Regional University
- Miami University
- Miami University Hamilton
- Miami University Middletown
- Michigan School of Psychology
- Michigan State University
- Michigan Technological University
- Mid–America Christian University
- Mid–America Nazarene University
- Mid–Atlantic Christian University
- Middle Georgia State University
- Middle Tennessee State University
- Middlebury College
- Middlebury Institute of International Studies at Monterey
- Middlesex College
- Middlesex Community College (Bedford, Massachusetts)
- Middlesex Community College (Middletown, Connecticut)
- Midland College
- Midland University
- Midlands Technical College
- Mid–Michigan College
- Mid–State Technical College
- Midway University
- Midwest College of Oriental Medicine
- Midwest Technical Institute
- Midwest University
- Midwestern State University
- Midwestern University
- Midwestern University Glendale
- Miles College
- Miles Community College
- Miles Law School
- Miller–Motte College
- Millersville University of Pennsylvania
- Milligan University
- Millikin University
- Millsaps College
- Milwaukee Area Technical College
- Milwaukee Institute of Art and Design
- Milwaukee School of Engineering
- Mineral Area College
- Minerva University
- Minneapolis College of Art and Design
- Minneapolis Community and Technical College
- Minnesota North College
- Minnesota State College Southeast
- Minnesota State Community and Technical College
- Minnesota State University Mankato
- Minnesota State University Moorhead
- Minnesota West Community and Technical College
- Minot State University
- Mira Costa College
- Misericordia University
- Mission College
- Mission University
- Mississippi Christian University
- Mississippi Christian University School of Law
- Mississippi Delta Community College
- Mississippi Gulf Coast Community College
- Mississippi State University
- Mississippi University for Women
- Mississippi Valley State University
- Missoula College
- Missouri Baptist University
- Missouri Southern State University
- Missouri State University
- Missouri State University West Plains
- Missouri University of Science and Technology
- Missouri Valley University
- Missouri Western State University
- Mitchell College
- Mitchell Community College
- Mitchell Technical College
- Mizpa Pentecostal University
- Moberly Area Community College
- Modesto Junior College
- Mohave Community College
- Mohawk Valley Community College
- Molloy University
- Monmouth College
- Monmouth University
- Monroe Community College
- Monroe County Community College
- Monroe University
- Montana State University
- Montana State University Billings
- Montana State University Northern
- Montana Technological University
- Montcalm Community College
- Montclair State University
- Monterey Peninsula College
- Montgomery College
- Montgomery Community College
- Montgomery County Community College
- Montreat College
- Montserrat College of Art
- Moore College of Art and Design
- Moorpark College
- Moraine Park Technical College
- Moraine Valley Community College
- Moravian University
- Morehead State University
- Morehouse College
- Morehouse School of Medicine
- Moreno Valley College
- Morgan Community College
- Morgan State University
- Morningside University
- Morris Brown College
- Morris College
- Morton College
- Motlow State Community College
- Mount Aloysius College
- Mount Holyoke College
- Mount Hood Community College
- Mount Marty University
- Mount Mary University
- Mount Mercy University
- Mount Saint Joseph University
- Mount Saint Mary College
- Mount St. Mary's University (Maryland)
- Mount Saint Mary's University Los Angeles
- Mount San Antonio College
- Mount San Jacinto College
- Mount Vernon Nazarene University
- Mount Wachusett Community College
- Mountain Empire Community College
- Mountain Gateway Community College
- Mountainland Technical College
- Mountwest Community and Technical College
- Muhlenberg College
- Multnomah University
- Murray State College
- Murray State University
- Muscatine Community College
- Muskegon Community College
- Muskingum University

== N ==
- Napa Valley College
- Naropa University
- Nash Community College
- Nashua Community College
- Nashville School of Law
- Nashville State Community College
- Nassau Community College
- National American University
- National College
- National Intelligence University
- National Louis University
- National Park College
- National University
- National University College
- National University of Health Sciences
- National University of Natural Medicine
- Naugatuck Valley Community College
- Navajo Technical University
- Naval Postgraduate School
- Navarro College
- Nazarene Bible College
- Nazareth University
- Nebraska College of Technical Agriculture
- Nebraska Methodist College
- Nebraska Wesleyan University
- Nelson University
- Neosho County Community College
- Neumann University
- Neumont College of Computer Science
- Nevada State University
- New Castle School of Trades
- New College of Florida
- New England Bible College
- New England College
- New England College of Optometry
- New England Conservatory of Music
- New England Institute of Technology
- New England School of Law Boston
- New Hampshire Technical Institute
- New Hope Christian College
- New Jersey Institute of Technology
- New Mexico Highlands University
- New Mexico Institute of Mining and Technology
- New Mexico Junior College
- New Mexico Military Institute
- New Mexico State University
- New River Community College
- New River Community and Technical College
- New Saint Andrews College
- New School
- New York Academy of Art
- New York City College of Technology
- New York College of Podiatric Medicine
- New York Film Academy
- New York Institute of Technology
- New York Law School
- New York Medical College
- New York School of Interior Design
- New York State College of Agriculture and Life Sciences
- New York State College of Ceramics
- New York State College of Human Ecology
- New York State College of Veterinary Medicine
- New York State School of Industrial and Labor Relations
- New York University
- Newberry College
- Newman University
- Niagara University
- Nicholls State University
- Nichols College
- Nicolet College
- Norco College
- Norfolk State University
- Normandale Community College
- North American University
- North Arkansas College
- North Carolina Agricultural and Technical State University
- North Carolina Central University
- North Carolina State University
- North Carolina Wesleyan University
- North Central College
- North Central Kansas Technical College
- North Central Michigan College
- North Central Missouri College
- North Central State College
- North Central Texas College
- North Central University
- North Country Community College
- North Dakota State College of Science
- North Dakota State University
- North Florida College
- North Georgia Technical College
- North Greenville University
- North Hennepin Community College
- North Idaho College
- North Iowa Area Community College
- North Park University
- North Seattle College
- North Shore Community College
- Northcentral Technical College
- Northeast Alabama Community College
- Northeast Iowa Community College
- Northeast Lakeview College
- Northeast Mississippi Community College
- Northeast Ohio Medical University
- Northeast State Community College
- Northeast Texas Community College
- Northeast Wisconsin Technical College
- Northeastern Baptist College
- Northeastern Illinois University
- Northeastern Junior College
- Northeastern Oklahoma A&M College
- Northeastern State University
- Northeastern Technical College
- Northeastern University
- Northern Arizona University
- Northern Essex Community College
- Northern Illinois University
- Northern Kentucky University
- Northern Maine Community College
- Northern Marianas College
- Northern Michigan University
- Northern New Mexico College
- Northern Oklahoma College
- Northern State University
- Northern Virginia Community College
- Northampton Community College
- Northland Community and Technical College
- Northland Pioneer College
- Northwest Arkansas Community College
- Northwest College
- Northwest Florida State College
- Northwest Iowa Community College
- Northwest Kansas Technical College
- Northwest Lineman College
- Northwest Mississippi Community College
- Northwest Missouri State University
- Northwest Nazarene University
- Northwest State Community College
- Northwest Technical College
- Northwest University
- Northwest Vista College
- Northwestern College (Bridgeview, Illinois)
- Northwestern College (Orange City, Iowa)
- Northwestern Connecticut Community College
- Northwestern Health Sciences University
- Northwestern Michigan College
- Northwestern Oklahoma State University
- Northwestern State University
- Northwestern University
- Northwest–Shoals Community College
- Northwood Technical College
- Northwood University
- Norwalk Community College
- Norwich University
- Notre Dame of Maryland University
- Notre Dame de Namur University
- Nova Southeastern University
- Nueta Hidatsa Sahnish College
- Nunez Community College

== O ==
- Oak Hills Christian College
- Oakland City University
- Oakland Community College
- Oakland University
- Oakton College
- Oakwood University
- Oberlin College
- Ocean County College
- Occidental College
- Oconee Fall Line Technical College
- Odessa College
- Ogden–Weber Technical College
- Ogeechee Technical College
- Oglala Lakota College
- Oglethorpe University
- Ohio Christian University
- Ohio Dominican University
- Ohio Northern University
- Ohio State University
- Ohio State University Agricultural Technical Institute
- Ohio State University at Lima
- Ohio State University at Mansfield
- Ohio State University at Marion
- Ohio State University at Newark
- Ohio Technical College
- Ohio University
- Ohio University Chillicothe
- Ohio University Eastern
- Ohio University Southern
- Ohio University Zanesville
- Ohio Wesleyan University
- Ohlone College
- Oikos University
- Oklahoma Baptist University
- Oklahoma Christian University
- Oklahoma City Community College
- Oklahoma City University
- Oklahoma Panhandle State University
- Oklahoma State University
- Oklahoma State University Institute of Technology
- Oklahoma State University Oklahoma City
- Oklahoma State University Tulsa
- Oklahoma Wesleyan University
- Old Dominion University
- Olin College
- Olive–Harvey College
- Olivet Nazarene University
- Olney Central College
- Olympic College
- Omega Graduate School
- Onondaga Community College
- Oral Roberts University
- Orange Coast College
- Orangeburg–Calhoun Technical College
- Oregon Coast Community College
- Oregon College of Oriental Medicine
- Oregon Health and Science University
- Oregon Institute of Technology
- Oregon State University
- Oregon State University Cascades
- Otero College
- Otis College of Art and Design
- Ottawa University
- Otterbein University
- Ouachita Baptist University
- Our Lady of the Lake University
- Owens Community College
- Owensboro Community and Technical College
- Oxnard College
- Ozark Christian College
- Ozarka College
- Ozarks Technical Community College

== P ==
- Pace University
- Pacific College of Health and Science
- Pacific Islands University
- Pacific Lutheran University
- Pacific Oaks College
- Pacific Union College
- Pacific University
- Pacifica Graduate Institute
- Paine College
- Palm Beach Atlantic University
- Palm Beach State College
- Palmer College of Chiropractic
- Palo Alto College
- Palo Alto University
- Palo Verde College
- Palomar College
- Pamlico Community College
- Panola College
- Paradise Valley Community College
- Paris Junior College
- Park University
- Parker University
- Parkland College
- Pasadena City College
- Pasco–Hernando State College
- Passaic County Community College
- Patrick Henry College
- Patrick and Henry Community College
- Paul Douglas Camp Community College
- Paul Quinn College
- Paul Smith's College
- Pearl River Community College
- Peirce College
- Pellissippi State Community College
- Peninsula College
- Pennsylvania Academy of the Fine Arts
- Pennsylvania College of Art and Design
- Pennsylvania College of Technology
- Pennsylvania Highlands Community College
- Pennsylvania Institute of Technology
- Pennsylvania State University
- Pennsylvania State University Abington
- Pennsylvania State University Altoona
- Pennsylvania State University Beaver
- Pennsylvania State University Behrend
- Pennsylvania State University Berks
- Pennsylvania State University Brandywine
- Pennsylvania State University Dickinson Law
- Pennsylvania State University DuBois
- Pennsylvania State University Fayette
- Pennsylvania State University Great Valley School of Graduate and Professional Studies
- Pennsylvania State University Greater Allegheny
- Pennsylvania State University Harrisburg
- Pennsylvania State University Hazleton
- Pennsylvania State University Lehigh Valley
- Pennsylvania State University Mont Alto
- Pennsylvania State University New Kensington
- Pennsylvania State University Schuylkill
- Pennsylvania State University Scranton
- Pennsylvania State University Shenango
- Pennsylvania State University Wilkes–Barre
- Pennsylvania State University York
- PennWest California
- PennWest Clarion
- PennWest Edinboro
- Pensacola Christian College
- Pensacola State College
- Pepperdine University
- Peru State College
- Pfeiffer University
- Pfeiffer University at Charlotte
- Philadelphia College of Osteopathic Medicine
- Phillips Community College of the University of Arkansas
- Phoenix College
- Piedmont Community College
- Piedmont Technical College
- Piedmont University
- Piedmont Virginia Community College
- Pierce College
- Pierpont Community and Technical College
- Pikes Peak State College
- Pillar College
- Pima Community College
- Pima Medical Institute
- Pine Technical and Community College
- Pinnacle Career Institute
- Pitt Community College
- Pittsburg State University
- Pittsburgh Institute of Aeronautics
- Pittsburgh Institute of Mortuary Science
- Pitzer College
- Plymouth State University
- Point Loma Nazarene University
- Point Park University
- Point University
- Polk State College
- Polytechnic University of Puerto Rico
- Pomona College
- Ponce Health Sciences University
- Pontifical Catholic University of Puerto Rico
- Pontifical Catholic University of Puerto Rico at Mayaguez
- Pontifical College Josephinum
- Porterville College
- Portland Bible College
- Portland Community College
- Portland State University
- Post University
- Potomac State College of West Virginia University
- Prairie State College
- Prairie View Agricultural and Mechanical University
- Pratt Community College
- Pratt Institute
- Presbyterian College
- Prescott College
- Prince George's Community College
- Prince William Sound College
- Princeton University
- Principia College
- Providence Christian College
- Providence College
- Provo College
- Pueblo Community College
- Puerto Rico Conservatory of Music
- Purchase College
- Purdue University
- Purdue University Fort Wayne
- Purdue University Northwest

== Q–R ==
- Quantic School of Business and Technology
- Queens College
- Queens University of Charlotte
- Queensborough Community College
- Quincy College
- Quincy University
- Quinebaug Valley Community College
- Quinnipiac University
- Quinsigamond Community College
- Radford University
- Ramapo College
- Randall University
- Randolph College
- Randolph Community College
- Randolph–Macon College
- Ranger College
- Ranken Technical College
- Rappahannock Community College
- Raritan Valley Community College
- Rasmussen University
- Reading Area Community College
- Red Rocks Community College
- Redlands Community College
- Reed College
- Reedley College
- Regent University
- Regis College
- Regis University
- Reid State Technical College
- Reinhardt University
- Relay Graduate School of Education
- Remington College
- Rend Lake College
- Rensselaer Polytechnic Institute
- Renton Technical College
- Respect Graduate School
- Rhode Island College
- Rhode Island School of Design
- Rhodes College
- Rice University
- Richard Bland College
- Richard Joseph Daley College
- Richland Community College
- Richmond Community College
- Rider University
- Ridgewater College
- Ringling College of Art and Design
- Rio Hondo College
- Rio Salado College
- Ripon College
- River Parishes Community College
- River Valley Community College
- Riverland Community College
- Riverside City College
- Rivier University
- Roane State Community College
- Roanoke College
- Roanoke–Chowan Community College
- Robert Morris University
- Roberts Wesleyan University
- Robeson Community College
- Rochester Christian University
- Rochester Community and Technical College
- Rochester Institute of Technology
- Rock Valley College
- Rockford University
- Rockhurst University
- Rockingham Community College
- Rockland Community College
- Rocky Mountain College
- Rocky Mountain College of Art and Design
- Rocky Mountain University of Health Professions
- Rocky Vista University
- Roger Williams University
- Rogers State University
- Rogue Community College
- Rollins College
- Roosevelt University
- Rosalind Franklin University of Medicine and Science
- Rose State College
- Rose–Hulman Institute of Technology
- Roseman University of Health Sciences
- Rosemont College
- Rowan College at Burlington County
- Rowan College of South Jersey
- Rowan University
- Rowan–Cabarrus Community College
- Roxbury Community College
- Rush University
- Russell Sage College
- Rust College
- Rutgers University Camden
- Rutgers University New Brunswick
- Rutgers University Newark

== S ==
- Sacramento City College
- Sacred Heart University
- Saddleback College
- Saginaw Chippewa Tribal College
- Saginaw Valley State University
- Saint Ambrose University
- Saint Anselm College
- Saint Anthony College of Nursing
- Saint Augustine's University
- Saint Bonaventure University
- Saint Catherine University
- Saint Charles Community College
- Saint Clair County Community College
- Saint Cloud State University
- Saint Cloud Technical and Community College
- Saint Edward's University
- Saint Elizabeth University
- Saint Francis College
- Saint Francis University
- Saint John Fisher University
- Saint John's College
- Saint Johns River State College
- Saint John's University (Collegeville, Minnesota)
- Saint John's University (New York, New York)
- Saint Joseph's College of Maine
- Saint Joseph's University
- Saint Joseph's University New York
- Saint Lawrence University
- Saint Leo University
- Saint Louis Christian College
- Saint Louis Community College
- Saint Louis University
- Saint Martin's University
- Saint Mary's Academy and College
- Saint Mary's College
- Saint Mary's College of California
- Saint Mary's College of Maryland
- Saint Mary's Seminary and University
- Saint Mary's University
- Saint Mary's University of Minnesota
- Saint Mary–of–the–Woods College
- Saint Michael's College
- Saint Norbert College
- Saint Olaf College
- Saint Paul College
- Saint Peter's University
- Saint Petersburg College
- Saint Philip's College
- Saint Thomas Aquinas College
- Saint Thomas University
- Saint Vincent College
- Saint Xavier University
- Salem College
- Salem Community College
- Salem State University
- Salem University
- Salina Area Technical College
- Salisbury University
- Salish Kootenai College
- Salt Lake Community College
- Salve Regina University
- Sam Houston State University
- Samford University
- Sampson Community College
- Samuel Merritt University
- San Antonio College
- San Bernardino Valley College
- San Diego Christian College
- San Diego City College
- San Diego Mesa College
- San Diego Miramar College
- San Diego State University
- San Diego University for Integrative Studies
- San Francisco Bay University
- San Francisco State University
- San Jacinto College
- San Joaquin College of Law
- San Joaquin Delta College
- San Jose City College
- San Jose State University
- San Juan Bautista School of Medicine
- San Juan College
- Sandhills Community College
- Santa Ana College
- Santa Barbara City College
- Santa Clara University
- Santa Fe College
- Santa Fe Community College
- Santa Monica College
- Santa Rosa Junior College
- Santiago Canyon College
- Sarah Lawrence College
- Sauk Valley Community College
- Savannah College of Art and Design
- Savannah State University
- Savannah Technical College
- Saybrook University
- Schiller International University
- School of Architecture
- School of the Art Institute of Chicago
- School for International Training
- School of Plastic Arts and Design
- School of Visual Concepts
- Schoolcraft College
- Schreiner University
- Scott Community College
- Scottsdale Community College
- Scripps College
- Seattle Bible College
- Seattle Central College
- Seattle Pacific University
- Seattle University
- Seattle Vocational Institute
- Selma University
- Seminole State College
- Seminole State College of Florida
- Seton Hall University
- Seton Hill University
- Sewanee: The University of the South
- Seward County Community College
- Shasta College
- Shaw University
- Shawnee Community College
- Shawnee State University
- Shelton State Community College
- Shenandoah University
- Shepherd University
- Sheridan College
- Sherman College of Chiropractic
- Shippensburg University of Pennsylvania
- Shoreline Community College
- Shorter College
- Shorter University
- Siena University
- Siena Heights University
- Sierra College
- Simmons College of Kentucky
- Simmons University
- Simpson College
- Simpson University
- Sinclair Community College
- Sinte Gleska University
- Sisseton Wahpeton College
- Sitting Bull College
- Skagit Valley College
- Skidmore College
- Skyline College
- Slippery Rock University
- Smith College
- Snead State Community College
- Snow College
- Soka University of America
- Solano Community College
- Somerset Community College
- Sonoma State University
- South Arkansas Community College
- South Carolina State University
- South Central College
- South College
- South Dakota School of Mines and Technology
- South Dakota State University
- South Florida Bible College & Theological Seminary
- South Florida State College
- South Georgia State College
- South Georgia Technical College
- South Louisiana Community College
- South Mountain Community College
- South Piedmont Community College
- South Plains College
- South Puget Sound Community College
- South Seattle College
- South Suburban College
- South Texas College
- South Texas College of Law Houston
- South University
- Southcentral Kentucky Community and Technical College
- Southeast Arkansas College
- Southeast Kentucky Community and Technical College
- Southeast Missouri State University
- Southeastern Baptist College
- Southeastern College
- Southeastern Community College (West Burlington, Iowa)
- Southeastern Community College (Whiteville, North Carolina)
- Southeastern Illinois College
- Southeastern Louisiana University
- Southeastern Oklahoma State University
- Southeastern Technical College
- Southeastern University
- Southern Adventist University
- Southern Arkansas University
- Southern Arkansas University Tech
- Southern California Institute of Architecture
- Southern College of Optometry
- Southern Connecticut State University
- Southern Crescent Technical College
- Southern Illinois University
- Southern Illinois University Edwardsville
- Southern Maine Community College
- Southern Methodist University
- Southern Nazarene University
- Southern New Hampshire University
- Southern Oregon University
- Southern Regional Technical College
- Southern State Community College
- Southern States University
- Southern Technical College
- Southern Union State Community College
- Southern University
- Southern University at New Orleans
- Southern University at Shreveport
- Southern Utah University
- Southern Virginia University
- Southern Wesleyan University
- Southern West Virginia Community and Technical College
- Southside Virginia Community College
- Southwest Baptist University
- Southwest Louisiana Technical Community College
- Southwest Minnesota State University
- Southwest Mississippi Community College
- Southwest Technical College
- Southwest Tennessee Community College
- Southwest Texas Junior College
- Southwest Virginia Community College
- Southwest Wisconsin Technical College
- Southwestern Adventist University
- Southwestern Christian College
- Southwestern Christian University
- Southwestern College (Chula Vista, California)
- Southwestern College (Santa Fe, New Mexico)
- Southwestern College (Winfield, Kansas)
- Southwestern Community College (Creston, Iowa)
- Southwestern Community College (Sylva, North Carolina)
- Southwestern Illinois College
- Southwestern Indian Polytechnic Institute
- Southwestern Law School
- Southwestern Michigan College
- Southwestern Oklahoma State University
- Southwestern Oregon Community College
- Southwestern University
- Spalding University
- Spartan College of Aeronautics and Technology
- Spartanburg Community College
- Spartanburg Methodist College
- Spelman College
- Spertus Institute for Jewish Learning and Leadership
- Spokane Community College
- Spokane Falls Community College
- Spoon River College
- Spring Arbor University
- Spring Hill College
- Springfield College
- Springfield Technical Community College
- Stanford University
- Stanly Community College
- Stark State College
- State College of Florida Manatee–Sarasota
- State Fair Community College
- State Technical College of Missouri
- State University of Iowa
- State University of New York at Adirondack
- State University of New York at Brockport
- State University of New York Broome Community College
- State University of New York at Canton
- State University of New York Clinton Community College
- State University of New York at Cobleskill
- State University of New York College of Environmental Science and Forestry
- State University of New York College of Optometry
- State University of New York Corning Community College
- State University of New York at Cortland
- State University of New York at Delhi
- State University of New York at Erie
- State University of New York at Fredonia
- State University of New York Genesee Community College
- State University of New York at Geneseo
- State University of New York Jefferson Community College
- State University of New York at Morrisville
- State University of New York at New Paltz
- State University of New York at Niagara
- State University of New York at Old Westbury
- State University of New York at Orange
- State University of New York at Oswego
- State University of New York at Plattsburgh
- State University of New York Polytechnic Institute
- State University of New York at Potsdam
- State University of New York Schenectady County Community College
- State University of New York at Sullivan
- State University of New York at Ulster
- State University of New York Westchester Community College
- Stephen Fuller Austin State University
- Stephens College
- Sterling College (Craftsbury, Vermont)
- Sterling College (Sterling, Kansas)
- Stetson University
- Stevens Institute of Technology
- Stevenson University
- Stillman College
- Stockton University
- Stone Child College
- Stonehill College
- Stony Brook University
- Strayer University
- Suffolk County Community College
- Suffolk University
- Sul Ross State University
- Sullivan University
- Summit Christian College
- Sumner College
- Surry Community College
- Susquehanna University
- Sussex County Community College
- Swarthmore College
- Sweet Briar College
- Syracuse University

== T ==
- Tabor College
- Tacoma Community College
- Taft College
- Talladega College
- Tallahassee Community College
- Tarleton State University
- Tarrant County College
- Taylor Business Institute
- Taylor University
- Technical College of the Lowcountry
- Temple College
- Temple University
- Temple University Ambler
- Tennessee Bible College
- Tennessee College of Applied Technology
- Tennessee State University
- Tennessee Technological University
- Tennessee Wesleyan University
- Terra State Community College
- Texarkana College
- Texas Agricultural and Mechanical International University
- Texas Agricultural and Mechanical University
- Texas Agricultural and Mechanical University Central Texas
- Texas Agricultural and Mechanical University Corpus Christi
- Texas Agricultural and Mechanical University Kingsville
- Texas Agricultural and Mechanical University San Antonio
- Texas Agricultural and Mechanical University Texarkana
- Texas Agricultural and Mechanical University Victoria
- Texas Chiropractic College
- Texas Christian University
- Texas College
- Texas Lutheran University
- Texas Southern University
- Texas Southmost College
- Texas State Technical College
- Texas State University
- Texas Tech University
- Texas Tech University at Highland Lakes
- Texas Wesleyan University
- Texas Woman's University
- Thaddeus Stevens College of Technology
- Thiel College
- Thomas Aquinas College
- Thomas College
- Thomas Edison State University
- Thomas Jefferson University
- Thomas More College of Liberal Arts
- Thomas More University
- Thomas University
- Three Rivers College
- Three Rivers Community College
- Tidewater Community College
- Tiffin University
- Tillamook Bay Community College
- Toccoa Falls College
- Tohono O'odham Community College
- Tompkins Cortland Community College
- Tooele Technical College
- Tougaloo College
- Touro University
- Touro University California
- Touro University Nevada
- Towson University
- Toyota Technological Institute at Chicago
- Transylvania University
- Treasure Valley Community College
- Trevecca Nazarene University
- Tri–County Community College
- Tri–County Technical College
- Trident Technical College
- Trine University
- Trinidad State College
- Trinity College of Jacksonville
- Trinity Bible College and Graduate School
- Trinity Christian College
- Trinity College
- Trinity College of Florida
- Trinity International University
- Trinity Southwest University
- Trinity University
- Trinity Valley Community College
- Trinity Washington University
- Triton College
- Trocaire College
- Troy University
- Truckee Meadows Community College
- Truett McConnell University
- Truman State University
- Tufts University
- Tulane University
- Tulsa Community College
- Tunxis Community College
- Turtle Mountain College
- Tusculum University
- Tuskegee University
- Tyler Junior College

== U ==
- Uintah Basin Technical College
- Umpqua Community College
- Uniformed Services University of the Health Sciences
- Union Adventist University
- Union College (Elizabeth, New Jersey)
- Union College (Schenectady, New York)
- Union Commonwealth University
- Union Institute and University
- Union University
- United States Air Force Academy
- United States Army War College
- United States Coast Guard Academy
- United States Merchant Marine Academy
- United States Military Academy
- United States Naval Academy
- United States Sports Academy
- United Tribes Technical College
- Unity College
- Universal Technical Institute
- Universities at Shady Grove
- University of Advancing Technology
- University of Akron
- University of Akron Wayne College
- University of Alabama
- University of Alabama at Birmingham
- University of Alabama in Huntsville
- University of Alaska Anchorage
- University of Alaska Fairbanks
- University of Alaska Southeast
- University at Albany
- University of Antelope Valley
- University of Arizona
- University of Arkansas
- University of Arkansas Community College at Batesville
- University of Arkansas Community College at Morrilton
- University of Arkansas at Fort Smith
- University of Arkansas Hope–Texarkana
- University of Arkansas at Little Rock
- University of Arkansas at Monticello
- University of Arkansas at Pine Bluff
- University of Arkansas Pulaski Technical College
- University of Arkansas Rich Mountain
- University of Austin
- University of the Arts
- University of Baltimore
- University of Bridgeport
- University at Buffalo
- University of California Berkeley
- University of California Davis
- University of California Irvine
- University of California Los Angeles
- University of California Merced
- University of California Riverside
- University of California San Diego
- University of California San Francisco
- University of California Santa Barbara
- University of California Santa Cruz
- University of Central Arkansas
- University of Central Florida
- University of Central Missouri
- University of Central Oklahoma
- University of Charleston
- University of Chicago
- University of Cincinnati
- University of Cincinnati Blue Ash College
- University of Cincinnati Clermont College
- University of Colorado
- University of Connecticut
- University of the Cumberlands
- University of Dallas
- University of Dayton
- University of Delaware
- University of Denver
- University of Detroit Mercy
- University of the District of Columbia
- University of Dubuque
- University of Evansville
- University of Fairfax
- University of Findlay
- University of Florida
- University of Fort Lauderdale
- University of Georgia
- University of Guam
- University of Hartford
- University of Hawaiʻi at Hilo
- University of Hawaiʻi at Mānoa
- University of Hawaiʻi Maui College
- University of Hawaiʻi at West Oʻahu
- University of Health Sciences and Pharmacy in Saint Louis
- University of Holy Cross
- University of Houston
- University of Houston Clear Lake
- University of Houston Downtown
- University of Idaho
- University of Illinois Chicago
- University of Illinois Springfield
- University of Illinois Urbana–Champaign
- University of the Incarnate Word
- University of Indianapolis
- University of Jamestown
- University of Kansas
- University of Kentucky
- University of La Verne
- University of Louisiana at Lafayette
- University of Louisiana at Monroe
- University of Louisville
- University of Lynchburg
- University of Maine
- University of Maine at Augusta
- University of Maine at Farmington
- University of Maine at Fort Kent
- University of Maine at Machias
- University of Maine at Presque Isle
- University of Management and Technology
- University of Mary
- University of Mary Hardin–Baylor
- University of Mary Washington
- University of Maryland Baltimore
- University of Maryland Baltimore County
- University of Maryland Center for Environmental Science
- University of Maryland College Park
- University of Maryland Eastern Shore
- University of Massachusetts Amherst
- University of Massachusetts Boston
- University of Massachusetts Chan Medical School
- University of Massachusetts Dartmouth
- University of Massachusetts Lowell
- University of Memphis
- University of Miami
- University of Michigan
- University of Michigan Dearborn
- University of Michigan Flint
- University of Minnesota
- University of Minnesota Crookston
- University of Minnesota Duluth
- University of Minnesota Morris
- University of Minnesota Rochester
- University of Mississippi
- University of Missouri
- University of Missouri Kansas City
- University of Missouri Saint Louis
- University of Mobile
- University of Montana
- University of Montana Western
- University of Montevallo
- University of Mount Olive
- University of Mount Saint Vincent
- University of Mount Union
- University of Nebraska at Kearney
- University of Nebraska Lincoln
- University of Nebraska Omaha
- University of Nevada Las Vegas
- University of Nevada Reno
- University of New England
- University of New Hampshire
- University of New Hampshire at Manchester
- University of New Hampshire School of Law
- University of New Haven
- University of New Mexico
- University of North Alabama
- University of North Carolina at Asheville
- University of North Carolina at Chapel Hill
- University of North Carolina at Charlotte
- University of North Carolina at Pembroke
- University of North Carolina School of the Arts
- University of North Carolina Wilmington
- University of North Dakota
- University of North Florida
- University of North Georgia
- University of North Texas
- University of North Texas at Dallas
- University of Northern Colorado
- University of Northern Iowa
- University of Northwestern
- University of Northwestern Ohio
- University of Notre Dame
- University of Oklahoma
- University of Olivet
- University of Oregon
- University of the Ozarks
- University of the Pacific
- University of Pennsylvania
- University of Pikeville
- University of Pittsburgh
- University of Pittsburgh at Bradford
- University of Pittsburgh at Greensburg
- University of Pittsburgh at Johnstown
- University of Pittsburgh at Titusville
- University of Portland
- University of the Potomac
- University of Providence
- University of Puerto Rico at Aguadilla
- University of Puerto Rico at Arecibo
- University of Puerto Rico at Bayamon
- University of Puerto Rico at Carolina
- University of Puerto Rico at Cayey
- University of Puerto Rico at Humacao
- University of Puerto Rico at Mayaguez
- University of Puerto Rico at Ponce
- University of Puerto Rico Rio Piedras
- University of Puerto Rico at Utuado
- University of Puget Sound
- University of Redlands
- University of Rhode Island
- University of Richmond
- University of Rio Grande
- University of Rochester
- University of the Sacred Heart
- University of Saint Francis (Fort Wayne, Indiana)
- University of Saint Francis (Joliet, Illinois)
- University of Saint Joseph
- University of Saint Mary
- University of Saint Thomas (Houston, Texas)
- University of Saint Thomas (Saint Paul, Minnesota)
- University of San Diego
- University of San Francisco
- University of Science and Arts of Oklahoma
- University of Scranton
- University of Silicon Valley
- University of Sioux Falls
- University of South Alabama
- University of South Carolina
- University of South Carolina Aiken
- University of South Carolina Beaufort
- University of South Carolina Lancaster
- University of South Carolina Salkehatchie
- University of South Carolina Sumter
- University of South Carolina Union
- University of South Carolina Upstate
- University of South Dakota
- University of South Florida
- University of Southern California
- University of Southern Indiana
- University of Southern Maine
- University of Southern Mississippi
- University of the Southwest
- University System of Maryland at Hagerstown
- University of Tampa
- University of Tennessee at Chattanooga
- University of Tennessee Knoxville
- University of Tennessee at Martin
- University of Tennessee Southern
- University of Texas at Arlington
- University of Texas at Austin
- University of Texas at Dallas
- University of Texas at El Paso
- University of Texas Permian Basin
- University of Texas Rio Grande Valley
- University of Texas at San Antonio
- University of Texas at Tyler
- University of Toledo
- University of Tulsa
- University of Utah
- University of Valley Forge
- University of Vermont
- University of the Virgin Islands
- University of Virginia
- University of Virginia's College at Wise
- University of Washington
- University of Washington Bothell
- University of Washington Tacoma
- University of the West
- University of West Alabama
- University of West Florida
- University of West Georgia
- University of West Los Angeles
- University of Western States
- University of Wisconsin Eau Claire
- University of Wisconsin Eau Claire Barron County
- University of Wisconsin Green Bay
- University of Wisconsin Green Bay Manitowoc
- University of Wisconsin Green Bay Marinette
- University of Wisconsin Green Bay Sheboygan
- University of Wisconsin La Crosse
- University of Wisconsin Madison
- University of Wisconsin Milwaukee
- University of Wisconsin Milwaukee at Washington County
- University of Wisconsin Milwaukee at Waukesha
- University of Wisconsin Oshkosh
- University of Wisconsin Oshkosh Fond du Lac
- University of Wisconsin Oshkosh Fox Cities
- University of Wisconsin Platteville
- University of Wisconsin Platteville Baraboo Sauk County
- University of Wisconsin Platteville Richland
- University of Wisconsin Parkside
- University of Wisconsin River Falls
- University of Wisconsin Stevens Point
- University of Wisconsin Stevens Point at Marshfield
- University of Wisconsin Stevens Point at Wausau
- University of Wisconsin Stout
- University of Wisconsin Superior
- University of Wisconsin Whitewater
- University of Wisconsin Whitewater at Rock County
- University of Wyoming
- Upper Iowa University
- Upstate Medical University
- Urban College of Boston
- Ursinus College
- Ursuline College
- Utah State University
- Utah Tech University
- Utah Valley University
- Utica University

== V ==
- Valdosta State University
- Valencia College
- Valley City State University
- Valparaiso University
- Vance–Granville Community College
- Vanderbilt University
- VanderCook College of Music
- Vanguard University
- Vassar College
- Vaughn College of Aeronautics and Technology
- Ventura College
- Vernon College
- Vermont College of Fine Arts
- Vermont Law and Graduate School
- Vermont State University
- Victor Valley College
- Victoria College
- Villanova University
- Vincennes University
- Virginia Commonwealth University
- Virginia Highlands Community College
- Virginia Peninsula Community College
- Virginia Tech
- Virginia State University
- Virginia Union University
- Virginia University of Lynchburg
- Virginia Western Community College
- Viterbo University
- Volunteer State Community College
- Voorhees University

== W–Z ==
- Wabash College
- Wabash Valley College
- Wade College
- Wagner College
- Wake Forest University
- Wake Technical Community College
- Walden University
- Waldorf University
- Walla Walla Community College
- Walla Walla University
- Wallace Community College
- Wallace Community College Selma
- Wallace State Community College
- Walnut Hill College
- Walsh College
- Walsh University
- Walters State Community College
- Warner Pacific University
- Warner University
- Warren County Community College
- Warren Wilson College
- Wartburg College
- Washburn Institute of Technology
- Washburn University
- Washington Adventist University
- Washington College
- Washington County Community College
- Washington & Jefferson College
- Washington and Lee University
- Washington State Community College
- Washington State University
- Washington State University Everett
- Washington State University Spokane
- Washington State University Tri-Cities
- Washington State University Vancouver
- Washington University in St. Louis
- Washtenaw Community College
- Waubonsee Community College
- Waukesha County Technical College
- Wayland Baptist University
- Wayland Baptist University (Alaska)
- Wayne Community College
- Wayne County Community College
- Wayne State College
- Wayne State University
- Waynesburg University
- Weatherford College
- Webb Institute
- Webber International University
- Weber State University
- Webster University
- Welch College
- Wellesley College
- Wenatchee Valley College
- Wentworth Institute of Technology
- Wesleyan College
- West Chester University
- West Georgia Technical College
- West Hills College Coalinga
- West Hills College Lemoore
- West Kentucky Community and Technical College
- West Liberty University
- West Los Angeles College
- West Shore Community College
- West Texas A&M University
- West Valley College
- West Virginia Junior College
- West Virginia Northern Community College
- West Virginia School of Osteopathic Medicine
- West Virginia State University
- West Virginia University
- West Virginia University Institute of Technology
- West Virginia University at Parkersburg
- West Virginia Wesleyan College
- Westcliff University
- Western Carolina University
- Western Colorado University
- Western Connecticut State University
- Western Dakota Technical Institute
- Western Governors University
- Western Illinois University
- Western Iowa Tech Community College
- Western Kentucky University
- Western Kentucky University-Owensboro
- Western Michigan University
- Western Nevada College
- Western New England University
- Western New Mexico University
- Western Oklahoma State College
- Western Oregon University
- Western Piedmont Community College
- Western Technical College
- Western University of Health Sciences
- Western Washington University
- Western Wyoming Community College
- Westfield State University
- Westminster College (Fulton, Missouri)
- Westminster College (New Wilmington, Pennsylvania)
- Westminster College (Salt Lake City, Utah)
- Westmont College
- Westmoreland County Community College
- Westwood College
- Wharton County Junior College
- Whatcom Community College
- Wheaton College (Norton, Massachusetts)
- Wheaton College (Wheaton, Illinois)
- Wheeling University
- White Mountains Community College
- Whitman College
- Whittier College
- Whitworth University
- Wichita State University
- Wichita State University Campus of Applied Sciences and Technology
- Widener University
- Widener University Commonwealth Law School
- Widener University Delaware Law School
- Wilberforce University
- Wilbur Wright College
- Wiley University
- Wilkes Community College
- Wilkes University
- Willamette University
- William Carey University
- William James College
- William Jewell College
- William Paterson University
- William Peace University
- William Penn University
- Hobart and William Smith Colleges
- William Woods University
- Williams Baptist University
- Williams College
- Williamsburg Technical College
- Williamson College
- Williamson College of the Trades
- Williston State College
- Wilmington College (Ohio)
- Wilson College (Pennsylvania)
- Wilson Community College
- Wind River Tribal College
- Windward Community College
- Wingate University
- Winona State University
- Winston-Salem State University
- Winthrop University
- Wiregrass Georgia Technical College
- Wisconsin Lutheran College
- Wisconsin School of Professional Psychology
- Wittenberg University
- Wofford College
- Won Institute of Graduate Studies
- Woodbury University
- Woodland Community College
- Worcester Polytechnic Institute
- Worcester State University
- Wor–Wic Community College
- Wright State University
- Wright State University–Lake Campus
- Wyoming Catholic College
- WyoTech
- Wytheville Community College
- Xavier University
- Xavier University of Louisiana
- Yakima Valley College
- Yale University
- Yavapai College
- Yeshiva University
- York College, City University of New York
- York College of Pennsylvania
- York County Community College
- York Technical College
- YTI Career Institute
- York University (Nebraska)
- Young Harris College
- Youngstown State University
- Yuba College
- Zane State College
- Zaytuna College
