= List of Phi Kappa Phi chapters =

Phi Kappa Phi is an international collegiate honor society. In the following list of chapters, active chapters are indicated in bold and inactive chapters are in italics.

| Chapter number | Charter date and range | Institution | Location | Status | Ref. |
|---|---|---|---|---|---|
| **1** | January 1, 1897 | University of Maine | Orono, Maine | Active | |
| **2** | April 21, 1899 | University of Tennessee | Knoxville, Tennessee | Active | |
| **3** | March 23, 1900 | Pennsylvania State University | State College, Pennsylvania | Active | |
| **4** | May 13, 1904 | University of Massachusetts Amherst | Amherst, Massachusetts | Active | |
| **5** | January 13, 1905 | University of Delaware | Newark, Delaware | Active | |
| **6** | October 23, 1911 | Iowa State University | Ames, Iowa | Active | |
| **7** | April 13, 1912 | University of Florida | Gainesville, Florida | Active | |
| **8** | May 4, 1912 | University of Nevada, Reno | Reno, Nevada | Active | |
| **9** | April 25, 1913 | University of Rhode Island | Kingston, Rhode Island | Active | |
| **10** | May 12, 1913 | North Dakota State University | Fargo, North Dakota | Active | |
| **11** | November 13, 1913 | Nebraska Wesleyan University | Lincoln, Nebraska | Active | |
| 12 | 1914 | Georgia Tech | Atlanta, Georgia | Inactive | |
| **13** | May 15, 1914 | Auburn University | Auburn, Alabama | Active | |
| **14** | November 15, 1915 | Kansas State University | Manhattan, Kansas | Active | |
| **15** | May 31, 1916 | University of Arizona | Tucson, Arizona | Active | |
| 16 | June 6, 1916 – 1978; 1988–2014 | Syracuse University | Syracuse, New York | Inactive | |
| **17** | October 7, 1916 | University of New Mexico | Albuquerque, New Mexico | Active | |
| 18 | 1919 | Washington State University | Pullman, Washington | Inactive | |
| **19** | January 29, 1920 | Missouri University of Science and Technology | Rolla, Missouri | Active | |
| **20** | February 2, 1920 | Utah State University | Logan, Utah | Active | |
| **21** | May 21, 1920 | University of Wisconsin–Madison | Madison, Wisconsin | Active | |
| **22 CP** | 1920–19xx ?; April 28, 2010 | University of Maryland, College Park | College Park, Maryland | Active | |
| 23 ? | 1920–1979; 1983 | Cornell University | Ithaca, New York | Inactive ? | |
| **24** | April 22, 1920 | Oklahoma State University–Stillwater | Stillwater, Oklahoma | Active | |
| **25** | December 10, 1921 | Virginia Tech | Blacksburg, Virginia | Active | |
| **26** | June 13, 1921 | Montana State University | Bozeman, Montana | Active | |
| 27 ? | 1922 | University of Utah | Salt Lake City, Utah | Inactive ? | |
| **28** | March 21, 1922 | University of Wyoming | Laramie, Wyoming | Active | |
| 29 | April 20, 1922 | Butler University | Indianapolis, Indiana | Inactive | |
| 30 ? | 1922 | University of New Hampshire | Durham, New Hampshire | Inactive ? | |
| **31** | December 15, 1922 | Illinois Wesleyan University | Bloomington, Illinois | Active | |
| **32** | December 1, 1923 | University of Georgia | Athens, Georgia | Active | |
| **33** | December 10, 1923 | North Carolina State University | Raleigh, North Carolina | Active | |
| **34** | March 13, 1924 | Dakota Wesleyan University | Mitchell, South Dakota | Active | |
| **35** | June 6, 1924 | Oregon State University | Corvallis, Oregon | Active | |
| **36** | June 14, 1924 | University of Southern California | Los Angeles, California | Active | |
| **37** | May 22, 1925 | Florida State University | Tallahassee, Florida | Active | |
| **38** | December 17, 1925 | Coe College | Cedar Rapids, Iowa | Active | |
| **39** | November 26, 1926 – 1970; 1979–1980; xxxx ? | University of Michigan | Ann Arbor, Michigan | Active | |
| 40 | May 12, 1927 | Colorado State University | Fort Collins, Colorado | Inactive | |
| **41** | May 27, 1927 | Michigan State University | East Lansing, Michigan | Active | |
| 42 | May 25, 1928 – 1976 | Parsons College | Fairfield, Iowa | Inactive | |
| **43** | March 22, 1930 | Louisiana State University | Baton Rouge, Louisiana | Active | |
| 44 | 1930 | University of Hawaii | Honolulu, Hawaii | Inactive | |
| **45** | January 17, 1933 | University of the Philippines Diliman | Diliman, Quezon City, Philippines | Closed | (Note: Chapter was inactive in 2018 but appears to have been reactivated in 2024.) |
| **46** | May 25, 1933 | University of Illinois Urbana-Champaign | Champaign, Illinois | Active | |
| 47 | June 3, 1933 – 1984 | Carnegie Mellon University | Pittsburgh, Pennsylvania | Inactive | |
| 48 | 1936 | Drexel University | Philadelphia, Pennsylvania | Inactive | |
| **49** | November 22, 1938 | Clemson University | Clemson, South Carolina | Active | |
| **50** | August 10, 1942 | University of Louisville | Louisville, Kentucky | Active | |
| 51 | June 1, 1949 | South Dakota State University | Brookings, South Dakota | Inactive | |
| **52** | June 3, 1949 | Millikin University | Decatur, Illinois | Active | |
| **53** | October 31, 1949 | Texas A&M University | College Station, Texas | Active | |
| **54** | November 2, 1949 | University of Houston | Houston, Texas | Active | |
| **55** | April 10, 1951 | University of Louisiana at Lafayette | Lafayette, Louisiana | Active | (Note: Chapter was formed at Southwestern University.) |
| **56** | April 12, 1951 | Louisiana Tech University | Ruston, Louisiana | Active | |
| **57** | May 3, 1951 | University of the Pacific | Stockton, California | Active | |
| **58** | May 18, 1951 | Brigham Young University | Provo, Utah | Active | |
| **59** | October 11, 1951 | University of Connecticut | Storrs, Connecticut | Active | |
| **60** | December 11, 1951 | Mississippi State University | Starkville, Mississippi | Active | |
| **61** | May 29, 1952 | University of Toledo | Toledo, Ohio | Active | |
| **62** | April 22, 1953 | California State University, Fresno | Fresno, California | Active | |
| **63** | July 10, 1953 | Northwestern State University | Natchitoches, Louisiana | Active | |
| **64** | November 20, 1953 | Berea College | Berea, Kentucky | Active | |
| 65 | January 27, 1954 | Fort Hays State University | Hays, Kansas | Inactive | |
| **67** | June 7, 1954 | San Jose State University | San Jose, California | Active | |
| **68** | October 18, 1954 – 1984; xxxx ? | University of Montana | Missoula, Montana | Active | |
| 69 | November 12, 1954 | University of California, Davis | Davis, California | Active | |
| 70 | 1954 | University of Miami | Coral Gables, Florida | Inactive | |
| 71 | 1955 | Michigan College of Mining and Technology | Houghton, Michigan | Inactive | |
| 72 | March 29, 1956 | Southern Illinois University Carbondale | Carbondale, Illinois | Active | |
| 73 | 1956 | Ohio University | Athens, Ohio | Inactive | |
| **74** | December 18, 1956 | Texas Tech University | Lubbock, Texas | Active | |
| **75** | March 11, 1956 | Southeastern Louisiana University | Hammond, Louisiana | Active | |
| **76** | February 1, 1957 | Mississippi University for Women | Columbus, Mississippi. | Active | |
| **77** | May 23, 1959 | University of Mississippi | University, Mississippi | Active | |
| **78** | May 15, 1959 | Northern Arizona University | Flagstaff, Arizona | Active | |
| **79** | May 19, 1960 | University of Idaho | Moscow, Idaho | Active | |
| **80** | September 1, 1960 | University of Wisconsin–Milwaukee | Milwaukee, Wisconsin | Active | |
| 81 | November 29, 1962 | California State University, Chico | Chico, California | Inactive | |
| **82** | December 5, 1962 | New Mexico State University | Las Cruces, New Mexico | Active | |
| **83** | December 7, 1962 | University of Texas at Austin | Austin, Texas | Active | |
| **84** | March 6, 1963 | California State University, Sacramento | Sacramento, California | Active | |
| **85** | March 26, 1963 | University of Evansville | Evansville, Indiana | Active | |
| **86** | May 11, 1963 | California State University, Long Beach | Long Beach, California | Active | |
| **87** | May 12, 1963 | Bradley University | Peoria, Illinois | Active | |
| 88 ? | 1963 | Northeastern University | Boston, Massachusetts | Inactive | |
| **89** | March 2, 1964 | Winthrop University | Rock Hill, South Carolina | Active | |
| 90 ? | 1963 | American University | Washington, D.C. | Inactive | |
| **91** | May 27, 1964 | Bowling Green State University | Bowling Green, Ohio | Active | |
| 92 ? | 1965 | Central Michigan University | Mount Pleasant, Michigan | Inactive | |
| **93** | January 12, 1965 | California State University, Los Angeles | Los Angeles, California | Active | |
| 94 ? | 1965 | California Polytechnic State University, San Luis Obispo | San Luis Obispo, California | Inactive | |
| **95** | April 23, 1965 | Lamar University | Beaumont, Texas | Active | |
| 96 | November 3, 1965 | San Diego State University | San Diego, California | Inactive | |
| **97** | May 19, 1966 | University of Nebraska Omaha | Omaha, Nebraska | Active | |
| **98** | May 30, 1967 | Ohio Northern University | Ada, Ohio | Active | |
| **99** | April 18, 1967 | University of Southern Mississippi | Hattiesburg, Mississippi | Active | |
| **100** | November 20, 1967 | University of Nevada, Las Vegas | Paradise, Nevada | Active | |
| 101 | April 19, 1968 | California State University, Fullerton | Fullerton, California | Inactive | |
| 102 | January 25, 1969 | University of Wisconsin–Whitewater | Whitewater, Wisconsin | Inactive | |
| **103** | March 28, 1969 | University of Missouri–Kansas City | Kansas City, Missouri | Active | |
| 104 | April 1969 – 2010 | University of Wisconsin–Eau Claire | Eau Claire, Wisconsin | Inactive | |
| 105 | May 2, 1969 | University of Puerto Rico | San Juan, Puerto Rico | Inactive | |
| 106 | May 2, 1969 | New Mexico Highlands University | Las Vegas, New Mexico | Inactive | |
| **107** | May 16, 1969 | Wesleyan College | Macon, Georgia | Active | |
| **108** | October 20, 1969 | Radford University | Radford, Virginia | Active | |
| 109 | 1970–1974, 1984 | Drake University | Des Moines, Iowa | Inactive | |
| **110** | February 26, 1970 | Idaho State University | Pocatello, Idaho | Active | |
| **111** | March 6, 1970 | Tennessee Tech | Cookeville, Tennessee | Active | |
| **112** | March 10, 1970 | East Tennessee State University | Johnson City, Tennessee | Active | |
| **113** | March 25, 1970 | University of Louisiana at Monroe | Monroe, Louisiana | Active | |
| **114** | April 17, 1970 | East Carolina University | Greenville, North Carolina | Active | |
| **115** | April 22, 1970 | Rochester Institute of Technology | Henrietta, New York | Active | |
| **116** | April 23, 1970 | University of New Orleans | New Orleans, Louisiana | Active | |
| **117** | April 23, 1970 | Alfred University | Alfred, New York | Active | |
| 118 | | | | Inactive ? | |
| **119** | February 5, 1971 | Weber State University | Ogden, Utah | Active | |
| **120** | February 8, 1971 | Eastern New Mexico University | Portales, New Mexico | Active | |
| **121** | April 19, 1971 | University of Memphis | Memphis, Tennessee | Active | |
| **122** | April 20, 1971 | Eastern Kentucky University | Richmond, Kentucky | Active | |
| **123** | April 21, 1971 | Georgia Southern University | Statesboro, Georgia | Active | |
| 124 ? | 1971 | McNeese State University | Lake Charles, Louisiana | Inactive | |
| **125** | April 26, 1971 | Purdue University | West Lafayette, Indiana | Active | |
| **126** | April 30, 1971 | University of South Florida | Tampa, Florida | Active | |
| **127** | May 21, 1971 | University of Tennessee at Martin | Martin, Tennessee | Active | |
| **128** | May 29, 1971 | Florida Atlantic University | Boca Raton, Florida | Active | |
| **129** | October 29, 1971 | Troy University | Troy, Alabama | Active | |
| **130** | November 12, 1971 | Washburn University | Topeka, Kansas | Active | |
| 131 | | | | Inactive ? | |
| **132** | December 10, 1971 | University of North Alabama | Florence, Alabama | Active | |
| 133 | January 21, 1972 | Miami University | Oxford, Ohio | Inactive | |
| **134** | January 23, 1972 | University of Arkansas at Little Rock | Little Rock, Arkansas | Active | |
| **135** | January 31, 1972 | University of Central Missouri | Warrensburg, Missouri | Active | |
| **136** | February 24, 1972 | Longwood University | Farmville, Virginia | Active | |
| **137** | May 10, 1972 | Western Illinois University | Macomb, Illinois | Active | |
| **138** | April 25, 1972 | Clarkson University | Potsdam, New York | Active | |
| **139** | April 26, 1972 | Delta State University | Cleveland, Mississippi | Active | |
| **140** | April 29, 1972 | Samford University | Homewood, Alabama | Active | |
| **141** | May 5, 1972 | Arkansas State University | Jonesboro, Arkansas | Active | |
| **142** | May 6, 1972 | Western Carolina University | Cullowhee, North Carolina | Active | |
| **143** | May 19, 1972 | Youngstown State University | Youngstown, Ohio | Active | |
| 144 ? | 1973 | California State Polytechnic University, Pomoma | Pomona, California | Inactive | |
| 145 ? | 1973–2021 | University of Wisconsin–Platteville | Platteville, Wisconsin | Inactive | |
| **146** | February 23, 1973 | University of West Florida | Pensacola, Florida | Active | |
| 147 | | | | Inactive ? | |
| **148** | May 12, 1973 | Morehead State University | Morehead, Kentucky | Active | |
| **149** | May 13, 1973 | University of Alabama in Huntsville | Huntsville, Alabama | Active | |
| **150** | May 21, 1973 | University of West Georgia | Carrollton, Georgia | Active | |
| **151** | May 23, 1973 | Georgia College & State University | Milledgeville, Georgia | Active | |
| 152 | May 25, 1973 | University of Illinois Chicago | Chicago, Illinois | Inactive | |
| 153 | | | | Inactive ? | |
| **154** | September 18, 1973 | Eastern Michigan University | Ypsilanti, Michigan | Active | |
| **155** | December 5, 1973 | Ohio State University | Columbus, Ohio | Active | |
| 156 | January 17, 1974 | Valdosta State University | Valdosta, Georgia | Inactive | |
| **157** | March 19, 1974 | Nicholls State University | Thibodaux, Louisiana | Active | |
| **158** | April 19, 1974 | University of Texas at El Paso | El Paso, Texas | Active | |
| 159 | April 26, 1974 | Boise State University | Boise, Idaho | Inactive | |
| **160** | April 28, 1974 | Northern Illinois University | DeKalb, Illinois | Active | |
| 162 | May 1, 1974 | Minnesota State University, Mankato | Mankato, Minnesota | Inactive | |
| **163** | May 3, 1974 | California State University, Northridge | Los Angeles, California | Active | |
| 164 | May 14, 1974 | University of Minnesota | Minneapolis, Minnesota | Inactive | |
| 165 ? | 1974–201x ? | Appalachian State University | Boone, North Carolina | Inactive | |
| 166 | 1974 | Augusta State University | Augusta, Georgia | Inactive | |
| **167** | September 25, 1974 | James Madison University | Harrisonburg, Virginia | Active | |
| **168** | September 26, 1974 | Salisbury University | Salisbury, Maryland | Active | |
| 169 ? | 1974 | St. Cloud State University | St. Cloud, Minnesota | Inactive | |
| **170** | November 11, 1974 | Missouri State University | Springfield, Missouri | Active | |
| 171 | May 1, 1975 | University of Kansas | Lawrence, Kansas | Inactive | |
| **172** | April 12, 1975 | University of North Georgia | Dahlonega, Georgia | Active | |
| **173** | April 25, 1975 | University of Southern Maine | Portland, Maine | Active | |
| **174** | May 15, 1975 | Cameron University | Lawton, Oklahoma | Active | |
| **175** | May 16, 1975 | Hood College | Frederick, Maryland | Active | |
| **176** | May 23, 1975 | Russell Sage College | Troy, New York | Active | |
| **177** | May 30, 1975 | University of Puget Sound | Tacoma, Washington | Active | |
| **178** | September 26, 1975 | Jacksonville State University | Jacksonville, Alabama | Active | |
| 179 | 1975 ? | Lock Haven University of Pennsylvania | Lock Haven, Pennsylvania | Inactive | |
| **180** | October 28, 1975 | Campbell University | Buies Creek, North Carolina | Active | |
| **181** | November 13, 1975 | West Virginia University | Morgantown, West Virginia | Active | |
| **182** | November 19, 1975 | University of Alabama at Birmingham | Birmingham, Alabama | Active | |
| **183** | March 1, 1976 | Central Washington University | Ellensburg, Washington | Active | |
| **184** | March 17, 1976 | College of Charleston | Charleston, South Carolina | Active | |
| **185** | March 18, 1976 | Columbus State University | Columbus, Georgia | Active | |
| 186 | April 8, 1976 | University of Alaska Fairbanks | College, Alaska | Inactive | |
| **187** | April 20, 1976 | Duquesne University | Pittsburgh, Pennsylvania | Active | |
| 188 | May 3, 1976 | Jackson State University | Jackson, Mississippi | Inactive | |
| **189** | May 7, 1976 | Westmont College | Montecito, California | Active | |
| 190 | 1976 | Montclair State University | Montclair, New Jersey | Inactive | |
| **191** | May 27, 1976 | Austin Peay State University | Clarksville, Tennessee | Active | |
| **192** | October 1, 1976 | Salem State University | Salem, Massachusetts | Active | |
| **193** | December 3, 1976 | Virginia Commonwealth University | Richmond, Virginia | Active | |
| **194** | April 13, 1977 | University of South Alabama | Mobile, Alabama | Active | |
| **195** | April 24, 1977 | Elmhurst University | Elmhurst, Illinois | Active | |
| 196 | May 9, 1977 | United States Naval Academy | Annapolis, Maryland | Inactive | |
| 197 | 1977 | Lewis & Clark College | Portland, Oregon | Inactive | |
| 198 | May 15, 1977 | West Virginia Wesleyan College | Buckhannon, West Virginia | Inactive | |
| **199** | May 31, 1977 | Kean University | Union, New Jersey | Active | |
| **200** | September 29, 1977 | Old Dominion University | Norfolk, Virginia | Active | |
| **201** | November 2, 1977 | Ithaca College | Ithaca, New York | Active | |
| **202** | November 11, 1977 | Bloomsburg University of Pennsylvania | Bloomsburg, Pennsylvania | Active | |
| **203** | May 25, 1978 | Southern Illinois University Edwardsville | Edwardsville, Illinois | Active | |
| **204** | November 24, 1978 | United States Military Academy | West Point, New York | Active | |
| **205** | November 30, 1978 | Francis Marion University | Florence, South Carolina | Active | |
| **206** | December 6, 1978 | Florida International University | University Park, Florida | Active | |
| 207 | 1978 | Virginia Military Institute | Lexington, Virginia | Inactive | |
| **208** | December 15, 1978 | The College of New Jersey | Ewing Township, New Jersey | Active | |
| **209** | December 16, 1978 | University of Montevallo | Montevallo, Alabama | Active | |
| **210** | April 10, 1979 | Lycoming College | Williamsport, Pennsylvania | Active | |
| **211** | May 4, 1979 | Millersville University of Pennsylvania | Millersville, Pennsylvania | Active | |
| **212** | May 8, 1979 | The Citadel | Charleston, South Carolina | Active | |
| **213** | May 8, 1979 | Pittsburg State University | Pittsburg, Kansas | Active | |
| **214** | May 14, 1979 | Widener University | Chester, Pennsylvania | Active | |
| **215** | May 26, 1979 | California State University, San Bernardino | San Bernardino, California | Active | |
| 216 | December 7, 1979 | University of Bridgeport | Bridgeport, Connecticut | Inactive | |
| **217** | February 13, 1980 | Grand Valley State University | Allendale, Michigan | Active | |
| **218** | February 15, 1980 | Portland State University | Portland, Oregon | Active | |
| 219 | March 2, 1980 | Plymouth State University | Plymouth, New Hampshire | Inactive | |
| **220** | March 23, 1980 | University of Houston–Clear Lake | | Active | |
| 221 | 1980 | Indiana State University | Terre Haute, Indiana | Inactive | |
| **222** | May 1, 1980 | University of North Carolina Wilmington | Wilmington, North Carolina | Active | |
| **223** | May 9, 1980 | Western Oregon University | Monmouth, Oregon | Active | |
| 224 | May 16, 1980 | Emporia State University | Emporia, Kansas | Inactive | |
| 225 | May 29, 1980 | Southern Oregon University | Ashland, Oregon | Active | |
| **226** | June 14, 1980 | University of North Florida | Jacksonville, Florida | Active | |
| **227** | September 30, 1980 | University of Missouri–St. Louis | St. Louis, Missouri | Active | |
| **228** | December 2, 1980 | University of North Carolina at Charlotte | Charlotte, North Carolina | Active | |
| **229** | April 8, 1981 | Texas Woman's University | Denton, Texas | Active | |
| **230** | April 15, 1981 | University of North Texas | Denton, Texas | Active | |
| **231** | April 17, 1982 | Texas A&M University–Victoria | Victoria, Texas | Active | |
| 232 | April 18, 1982 | University of Central Florida | Orlando, Florida | Inactive | |
| 233 ? | 1982 | University of Arkansas | Fayetteville, Arkansas | Inactive | |
| **234** | May 21, 1982 | Eastern Washington University | Cheney, Washington | Active | |
| **235** | June 2, 1982 | Mercer University | Macon, Georgia | Active | |
| 236 | | | | | |
| **237** | April 23, 1983 | State University of New York at Cortland | Cortland, New York | Active | |
| 238 | May 1, 1983 | Western Kentucky University | Bowling Green, Kentucky | Inactive | |
| 239 ? | 1983 | Pan American University | Edinburg, Texas | Inactive | |
| **240** | May 13, 1983 | Fordham University | New York City, New York | Active | |
| **241** | May 3, 1984 | California State University, Dominguez Hills | Carson, California | Active | |
| 242 | October 7, 1985 | Louisiana State University Shreveport | Shreveport, Louisiana | Inactive ? | |
| **243** | June 6, 1986 | University of Alabama | Tuscaloosa, Alabama | Active | |
| 244 | 1987 | Humbolt State University | Arcata, California | Inactive | |
| 245 | 1987 | University of Wisconsin–Stevens Point | Stevens Point, Wisconsin | Inactive | |
| **246** | December 6, 1987 | Middle Tennessee State University | Murfreesboro, Tennessee | Active | |
| 247 | February 8, 1988 | University of Wisconsin–River Falls | River Falls, Wisconsin | Inactive | |
| **248** | April 10, 1989 | Western Michigan University | Kalamazoo, Michigan | Active | |
| **249** | May 31, 1989 | Andrews University | Berrien Springs, Michigan | Active | |
| **250** | May 31, 1989 | Western Washington University | Bellingham, Washington | Active | |
| **251** | April 26, 1990 | University of Oklahoma | Norman, Oklahoma | Active | |
| 252 | June 8, 1990 | Wright State University | Fairborn, Ohio | Inactive | |
| 253 | October 26, 1990 | University of Alaska Anchorage | Anchorage, Alaska | Inactive | |
| 254 | November 1, 1990 | University of Tulsa | Tulsa, Oklahoma | Inactive | |
| **255** | December 7, 1990 | Auburn University at Montgomery | Montgomery, Alabama | Active | |
| **256** | February 6, 1991 | Kennesaw State University | Cobb County, Georgia | Active | |
| **257** | April 10, 1991 | Brigham Young University–Hawaii | Lāʻie, Hawaii | Active | |
| 258 | April 27, 1991 | State University of New York at Potsdam | Potsdam, New York | Inactive | |
| **259** | May 15, 1991 | Truman State University | Kirksville, Missouri | Active | |
| **260** | March 24, 1992 | Southeast Missouri State University | Cape Girardeau, Missouri | Active | |
| 261 | May 13, 1992 | Westfield State University | Westfield, Massachusetts | Inactive | |
| 262 | | | | | |
| **263** | April 7, 1993 | State University of New York at Plattsburgh | Plattsburgh, New York | Active | |
| 264 | April 27, 1993 | Purdue University Fort Wayne | Fort Wayne, Indiana | Inactive | |
| **265** | April 30, 1993 | University of Houston–Downtown | Houston, Texas | Active | |
| 266 | December 18, 1993 | Indiana University of Pennsylvania | Indiana, Pennsylvania | Inactive | |
| **267** | March 18, 1994 | Arcadia University | Glenside, Pennsylvania | Active | |
| **268** | April 15, 1994 | University of Lynchburg | Lynchburg, Virginia | Active | |
| **269** | April 22, 1994 | Kutztown University of Pennsylvania | Kutztown, Pennsylvania | Active | |
| 270 | April 23, 1994 | Shippensburg University of Pennsylvania | Shippensburg, Pennsylvania | Inactive | |
| **271** | April 24, 1994 | Tennessee State University | Nashville, Tennessee | Active | |
| **272** | May 5, 1994 | DePaul University | Chicago, Illinois | Active | |
| 273 | | | | | |
| **274** | April 27, 1995 | State University of New York at Oswego | Oswego, New York | Active | |
| **275** | November 14, 1995 | Elon University | Elon, North Carolina | Active | |
| **276** | May 6, 1997 | University of West Alabama | Livingston, Alabama | Active | |
| 277 | June 5, 1997 | Eastern Oregon University | La Grande, Oregon | Inactive | |
| **278** | November 30, 1997 | University of Pittsburgh at Johnstown | Johnstown, Pennsylvania | Active | |
| 279 | December 18, 1997 | University of Wisconsin–Green Bay | Green Bay, Wisconsin | Inactive | |
| 280 | | | | | |
| **281** | May 16, 1998 | Shepherd University | Shepherdstown, West Virginia | Active | |
| **282** | April 29, 1999 | California State University, Stanislaus | Turlock, California | Active | |
| 283 | May 2, 2002 | University of Nebraska at Kearney | Kearney, Nebraska | Inactive | |
| **284** | December 3, 2002 | Jacksonville University | Jacksonville, Florida | Active | |
| **285** | February 26, 2003 | Berry College | Mount Berry, Georgia | Active | |
| **286** | March 16, 2003 | University of Pittsburgh at Greensburg | Hempfield Township, Pennsylvania | Active | |
| **287** | April 27, 2003 | Georgetown College | Georgetown, Kentucky | Active | |
| 288 | April 27, 2003 | Clarion University of Pennsylvania | Clarion, Pennsylvania | Inactive | |
| **289** | May 9, 2003 | University of South Carolina | Columbia, South Carolina | Active | |
| 290 | October 27, 2003 | Ball State University | Muncie, Indiana | Inactive | |
| **291** | November 21, 2003 | North Carolina A&T State University | Greensboro, North Carolina | Active | |
| **292** | April 22, 2004 | McKendree University | Lebanon, Illinois | Active | |
| **293** | May 4, 2004 | Oklahoma City University | Oklahoma City, Oklahoma | Active | |
| **294** | November 4, 2004 | Slippery Rock University | Slippery Rock, Pennsylvania | Active | |
| **295** | April 14, 2005 | Florida Southern College | Lakeland, Florida | Active | |
| **296** | November 6, 2005 | Texas A&M University–Commerce | Commerce, Texas | Active | |
| 297 | April 9, 2006 | Georgia Southern University–Armstrong Campus | Savannah, Georgia | Inactive | |
| **298** | August 30, 2006 | Fontbonne University | Clayton, Missouri | Active | |
| **299** | August 31, 2006 | Wayne State College | Wayne, Nebraska | Active | |
| **300** | April 19, 2007 | University of Texas at Arlington | Arlington, Texas | Active | |
| **301** | August 30, 2007 | Brenau University | Gainesville, Georgia | Active | |
| **302** | November 28, 2007 | Murray State University | Murray, Kentucky | Active | |
| 303 | 2007 | Utah Valley University | Orem, Utah | Inactive | |
| **304** | April 17, 2008 | University of Texas at Tyler | Tyler, Texas | Active | |
| 305 | | | | | |
| **306** | April 27, 2009 | University of Kentucky | Lexington, Kentucky | Active | |
| 307 | May 2, 2009 | Black Hills State University | Spearfish, South Dakota | Inactive | |
| **308** | May 5, 2009 | Florida Institute of Technology | Melbourne, Florida | Active | |
| **22 UC** | May 2, 2010 | University of Maryland Global Campus | Adelphi, Maryland | Active | |
| 309 | | | | | |
| **310** | February 25, 2010 | University of Findlay | Findlay, Ohio | Active | |
| 311 | April 2010 | Carroll University | Waukesha, Wisconsin | Inactive | |
| **312** | May 5, 2010 | University of Maryland Eastern Shore | Princess Anne, Maryland | Active | |
| **22 BC** | May 6, 2010 | University of Maryland, Baltimore County | Catonsville, Maryland | Active | (Note: Phi Kappa Phi calls the University of Maryland Baltimore Campuses chapter. However, the website for the chapter is at the University of Maryland, Baltimore County.) |
| **313** | November 30, 2010 | Marshall University | Huntington, West Virginia | Active | |
| **314** | December 10, 2010 | University of Tampa | Tampa, Florida | Active | |
| **315** | January 21, 2011 | George Mason University | Fairfax, Virginia | Active | |
| **316** | April 19, 2011 | University of Texas at Dallas | Richardson, Texas | Active | |
| **317** | March 6, 2012 | University of Texas at San Antonio | San Antonio, Texas | Active | |
| 318 | | | | | |
| 319 | November 5, 2012 | Southern Utah University | Cedar City, Utah | Inactive | |
| **320** | January 9, 2013 | Nazareth University | Pittsford, New York | Active | |
| **321** | April 25, 2013 | Angelo State University | San Angelo, Texas | Active | |
| **322** | May 21, 2013 | Texas A&M University–Commerce | Commerce, Texas | Active | |
| **323** | May 15, 2013 | Clark Atlanta University | Atlanta, Georgia | Active | |
| **324** | August 29, 2013 | Augusta University | Augusta, Georgia | Active | |
| **325** | October 30, 2013 | Texas State University | San Marcos, Texas | Active | |
| **326** | January 15, 2014 | Massachusetts College of Pharmacy and Health Sciences | Worcester, Massachusetts | Active | |
| **327** | May 7, 2014 | St. Norbert College | De Pere, Wisconsin | Active | |
| **328** | August 18, 2014 | Texas A&M University–Corpus Christi | Corpus Christi, Texas | Active | |
| **329** | December 5, 2014 | Framingham State University | Framingham, Massachusetts | Active | |
| **330** | February 19, 2015 | Alfred State College | Alfred, New York | Active | |
| **331** | April 23, 2015 | Drury University | Springfield, Missouri | Active | |
| **332** | February 1, 2016 | Texas A&M University–Kingsville | Kingsville, Texas | Active | |
| 333 | February 19, 2016 | Pacific Lutheran University | Parkland, Washington | Inactive ? | |
| **334** | March 1, 2016 | Hillsdale College | Hillsdale, Michigan | Active | |
| **335** | April 13, 2016 | Caldwell University | Caldwell, New Jersey | Active | |
| **336** | August 19, 2016 | Pontifical Catholic University of Puerto Rico | Ponce, Puerto Rico | Active | |
| **337** | September 21, 2016 | Embry–Riddle Aeronautical University, Prescott | Prescott, Arizona | Active | |
| 338 | October 20, 2016 | Washington State University Tri-Cities | Richland, Washington | Inactive | |
| **339** | December 7, 2016 | Saint Martin's University | Lacey, Washington | Active | |
| **340** | January 25, 2017 | Saint Mary's College of California | Moraga, California | Active | |
| **341** | February 7, 2017 | Southern Virginia University | Buena Vista, Virginia | Active | |
| **342** | February 16, 2017 | Methodist University | Fayetteville, North Carolina | Active | |
| **343** | March 29, 2017 | Texas Tech University Health Sciences Center | Lubbock, Texas | Active | |
| **344** | October 13, 2017 | Long Island University | | Active | |
| **345** | January 9, 2018 | Nova Southeastern University | Fort Lauderdale, Florida | Active | |
| 346 | March 14, 2018 | Abraham Baldwin Agricultural College | Tifton, Georgia | Inactive | |
| **347** | March 15, 2018 | United States Air Force Academy | El Paso County, Colorado | Active | |
| **348** | March 16, 2018 | Frostburg State University | Frostburg, Maryland | Active | |
| 349 | September 5, 2018 | Queens University of Charlotte | Charlotte, North Carolina | Active | |
| **350** | November 27, 2018 | St. Catherine University | Saint Paul, Minnesota | Active | |
| **351** | February 11, 2019 | Marymount University | Arlington County, Virginia | Active | |
| **352** | March 13, 2019 | University of North Carolina at Greensboro | Greensboro, North Carolina | Active | |
| 353 | March 29, 2019 | Methodist College | Peoria, Illinois | Inactive | |
| **354** | March 11, 2020 | University of Guam | Mangilao, Guam | Active | |
| **355** | March 26, 2020 | National Intelligence University | Washington, D.C. | Active | |
| **356** | November 8, 2021 | Florida Gulf Coast University | Fort Myers, Florida | Active | |
| **357** | May 19, 2023 | Logan University | Chesterfield, Missouri | Active | |
| **358** | October 17, 2023 | Ave Maria University | Ave Maria, Florida | Active | |
| **359** | October 25, 2023 | Meredith College | Raleigh, North Carolina | Active | |
| **360** | November 3, 2023 | Sacred Heart University | Fairfield, Connecticut | Active | |
| **361** | November 20, 2023 | Winston-Salem State University | Winston-Salem, North Carolina | Active | |
