= San Diego University =

San Diego University may refer to the following in San Diego, California:

- San Diego University, merged with the San Diego College of Women in 1972 to form the University of San Diego, a private Roman Catholic research university
- San Diego State University, a public research university in the California State University system
- University of California, San Diego, a public research university in the UC school system
- San Diego University for Integrative Studies, a small, private university
- San Diego City College, a public, two-year community college

== See also ==
- Education in San Diego
