= Northeastern Baptist College =

Bible college in Vermont, US

Coordinates: 42.8954°N 73.1982°W

- Motto: The Mind of a Scholar, The Heart of a Shepherd, and The Perseverance of a Soldier.
- Type: Private Bible College
- Established: 2013; 13 years ago
- Affiliations: Baptist
- President: Mark Howell
- Academic staff: 20
- Students: 100 +/-
- Location: Bennington, Vermont, United States
- Website: www.nebcvt.org

Northeastern Baptist College is a Baptist college located in Bennington, Vermont, United States, affiliated with the Baptist Convention of New England and the Southern Baptist Convention.

== History ==
Northeastern Baptist College was founded in 2013 by Mark Ballard. It is affiliated with the Baptist Convention of New England which is in turn affiliated with the Southern Baptist Convention.

== Academics ==
Northeastern Baptist College is authorized by the state of Vermont to grant Associate and Bachelor degrees.

Northeastern offers Associate Degrees in Biblical Studies, Music Ministry and Business Administration. It offers Bachelor Degrees in Biblical Studies, Christian Counseling, Christian Education, and Business Administration. Students that are in the Biblical Studies degree plan can choose a concentration in either Church Planting, Pastoral Ministry, or Christian Ministry.

== Campus ==
The main campus of Northeastern is housed in the third and fourth floor of a former Ramada Inn and Conference Center in Bennington, Vermont. This space includes academic classrooms, faculty offices, study areas, and an auditorium that is used for chapel.

The Charles & Pauline Hogue Library is located on Main Street in downtown Bennington, about a mile from the main campus. Student housing is located at the Jehovah Jireh Hall, which is across the street from the library. The dorms house approximately 40 students. Additionally, the newly built apartments in Grey Allison Village house upperclassmen and married students.
