= Casey Treat =

American televangelist and author

- Born: May 11, 1955 (age 70); Seattle, Washington, U.S.
- Education: Seattle Bible College, B.A. (theology), 1980; Hansei University D.Th. (honorary), 2009
- Occupations: pastor, televangelist, author
- Years active: 1978-present
- Known for: Co-Founder and pastor, Christian Faith Center, Seattle, WA President of Vision College (formally Dominion College) Co-host, Your Unlimited Life TV program with wife Wendy
- Title: Casey Treat
- Spouse(s): Wendy Peterson, 1978–present
- Children: 2 sons, Caleb and Micah, 1 daughter, Tasha
- Website: http://www.caseytreat.com/

Casey Treat (born May 11, 1955) is an American pastor, televangelist, author and motivational speaker. He is the co-founder and co-pastor of Christian Faith Center in Federal Way, Washington. He hosts his own television program called Your Unlimited Life, which can be seen on the internet and on various Christian TV networks such as Daystar TV and the Trinity Broadcasting Network (TBN).

== Ministry ==
=== Christian Faith Center ===
In 1980, the Treats, while still attending bible college, founded Christian Faith Center in Seattle, which initially met in a gymnasium foyer of Seattle Christian School.

== Controversy ==
In 2017 Caleb Treat, Casey's son and executive pastor of Christian Faith Center, was sued over claims of sexual harassment. The case settled for an undisclosed sum of money.

Caleb, his wife Christa, and their 2 daughters moved to Birmingham, Alabama to be a part of Church of the Highlands in 2017 weeks after their second child was born.

In December 2018, a second lawsuit was filed against the Treats and the church, alleged sexual exploitation, abuse, and financial improprieties.

== See also ==
- Prosperity Theology
- Pentecostalism
