= Southern States University =

For-profit university in California

- Type: Private for-profit university
- Established: 1983
- Chancellor: Claudia Araiza, PhD
- Location: San Diego, California, United States
- Campus: San Diego, CA; Irvine, CA; Las Vegas, NV
- Colors: Blue, Yellow, Black, White
- Mascot: SSU Lions
- Website: www.ssu.edu

Southern States University (SSU) is a private for-profit university with its headquarters in San Diego, California. It is owned by Tepper Technologies, Inc., and has three locations, two in Southern California (San Diego and Irvine) and one in Nevada (Las Vegas). It is approved to operate by the California Bureau for Private Postsecondary Education (BPPE). Approval to operate means compliance with state standards as set forth in the law for approved educational institutions. In addition, Southern States University is licensed in the state of Nevada by the Commission on Postsecondary Education (CPE). Approval to operate means compliance with state standards as set forth in the law for licensed educational institutions. Southern States University is authorized by the Student and Exchange Visitor Program (SEVP) program to enroll international students (F1) in the USA.

== History ==
The institution was founded in 1983, originally in Orange County, California. Its current owner is Tepper Technologies, Inc., which purchased it in 2005.

== Academics ==
Southern States University offers a Bachelor of Business Administration (BBA), Master of Business Administration (MBA), and Master of Science in Information Technology (MSIT). Certificate programs are also offered in the areas of Marketing, Business, and Information Technology.

== Locations ==
SSU is based in San Diego, California. It has campuses in San Diego, Irvine, and Las Vegas.
