= New England Bible College and Seminary =

- Former names: Glen Cove Bible School and Grace Evangelical Seminary
- Type: Bible College
- Established: 1959; 67 years ago
- Religious affiliation: Evangelical Christian
- Chairman: Molly Sparling
- President: Dr. James Culbertson
- Dean: Dr. Daniel Moore
- Location: Augusta, Maine, United States
- Colors: Blue, Gray, and Yellow
- Website: NEBC.edu

Mission Statement Logo

New England Bible College and Seminary is a small Bible college and seminary in Augusta, Maine. There are on average 50 to 60 enrolled students each semester.

NEBCS is an independent evangelical Christian institution, but has roots in conservative Baptism.

== History ==
Glen Cove Bible College was founded in Rockland, Maine in 1959. They closed in 1979, but reopened in 1980 as New England Bible College in Portland, Maine, and later moved to South Portland. In 2015, NEBC merged with Grace Evangelical College and Seminary of Bangor, Maine to form New England Bible College and Seminary. They later relocated to Augusta.
