= Miami-Jacobs Career College =

For-profit vocational college in Ohio, U.S.

- Motto: Changing futures. Changing Lives.
- Type: Private for-profit career college
- Active: 1916–2018
- CEO: Alan Sussna
- Location: Cleveland, Columbus, Dayton, Independence, Sharonville, Springboro, Troy, Ohio, U.S.
- Campus: Urban
- Locations: 7 campuses & learning centers, online
- Website: www.miamijacobs.edu

Miami-Jacobs Career College was a private for-profit career college with locations throughout Ohio. Miami-Jacobs Career College had locations in several Ohio cities: Columbus, Dayton, Independence, Sharonville, Springboro, and Troy. All campuses were closed by April 2018.

== History ==
A penmanship expert named Edwin D. Babbitt opened the Miami Commercial School. One of Babbitt's early students, A. D. Wilt, earned his tuition by serving as the school's janitor. Two years later, Wilt became president of the school. He held the position for 52 years. Initially, training was offered in shorthand, business methods, arithmetic, and penmanship. Typing courses were added later.

In the 1870s, the school pioneered in admitting women to classes that would prepare them for office positions. In 1908, the college introduced the Gregg Shorthand system to Ohio. In 1912, the college was one of the first in the country to teach machine shorthand: Stenotype. Dayton's second business school, the Jacobs Business College, merged with Miami Commercial in 1916, to form Miami-Jacobs.

In the Williams City Directory, Dayton, Ohio, for 1919-1920, is a record of The "Miami-Jacobs Business College-Incorporated 1916. Capital, $20,000 W. E. Harbottle, President and Principal. Third floor, s. e. c. 2d and Ludlow.

In 1922, a collegiate curriculum was established, with subjects listed in credit hours, with classes organized as lecture-style groups rather than for individual instruction, and with a four-year program leading to a bachelor's degree. As business subjects became more popular in high school, Miami-Jacobs, for a period of over 10 years, was chartered by the state to provide training for business teachers.

In 1956, Miami-Jacobs received its accreditation as a Junior College of Business and began awarding associate degrees.

In October 1974, the college gave up its building at Second & Ludlow Streets to the City of Dayton for the Courthouse Square project and moved to a campus location with additional parking facilities at Second & Madison Streets— five blocks east of its longtime Second & Ludlow home. In August 2002, the college moved to a new facility located at the corner of Second and Patterson.

In December 2003, Miami-Jacobs Career College was acquired by Delta Educational Systems, Inc., a Virginia Corporation approved to do business in the State of Ohio. In 2005, Miami-Jacobs Career College opened its first branch in Springboro, Ohio, offering courses in medical assisting, dental assisting, massage therapy, cosmetology, and esthetics. In 2007, the Troy, Ohio, branch opened offering courses in medical assisting, massage therapy, cosmetology and esthetics.

In 2008, The Academy of Court Reporting in Columbus and Cincinnati, Ohio, also acquired by Delta Career Education Corporation, changed its name to Miami-Jacobs Career College. A comprehensive evening school program was offered throughout the year by Miami-Jacobs Career College.

== Accreditation ==
Miami-Jacobs Career College was formerly accredited by the Accrediting Council for Independent Colleges and Schools (ACICS) to award certificates, diplomas, and associate degrees. The college was also authorized by the Ohio State Board of Career Colleges and Schools to confer associate degrees.

== Closure ==
On July 1, 2016, it was announced that Miami-Jacobs would close its campuses in Dayton, Sharonville, Springboro, and Troy. The Independence campus was reported to have closed in November 2017, while the final location in Columbus ceased operations in April 2018.
