= Christian College of Georgia =

College in Georgia, United States

Coordinates: 33°58′5″N 83°26′20″W

Christian College of Georgia is affiliated with the Christian Church (Disciples of Christ).

The Christian College of Georgia was chartered in Atlanta in 1947, and is registered with the Secretary of State of Georgia. Christian College is authorized by the State of Georgia to grant diplomas, certificates and degrees in religion, religious studies, and in disciplines related to Christian Ministry.

Christian College of Georgia is governed by volunteer Board of Trustees selected from the membership of the Christian Churches (Disciples of Christ) in Georgia. There are twelve Trustees, constituting three Christian Church (Disciples of Christ), one Licensed, and eight Ordained Ministers. The original agreement for instruction with the University of Georgia was discontinued in 1960, but the College continues the ministries adopted in its founding.

Funding of the College program is from gifts from congregations and individuals, and from an Endowment. The Endowment was created and is sustained by gifts from a number of benefactors; the majority of funds held in trust are from the sale of the Athens campus from 1989 to 1997. Offices are located in Statham in property received from the Statham Christian Church upon its closing in 1997. (This historic sanctuary was constructed in 1900, and was restored by the College in 1997.)

Central to the College Mission is partnership with the Region of the Christian Church (Disciples of Christ) in Georgia. The College is poised to support ministries throughout the Region in educational efforts which are consistent with this mission. In addition, College representatives consult with congregations and clergy in the Region in the development of educational programs for ministry and leader development.
