= Taylor Business Institute =

Coordinates: 41°52′55″N 87°37′36″W

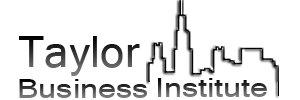
- Type: Private for-profit career college
- Established: 1962
- President: Janice C. Parker
- Students: ~200 (2025 est.)
- Location: Chicago, Illinois, United States
- Website: www.tbiil.edu

Taylor Business Institute Chicago (TBI) is a private, for-profit career college in Chicago, Illinois. Founded in 1962, the institution offers associate degrees, certificates, and English language instruction. It is accredited by the Higher Learning Commission.

== History ==
Taylor Business Institute was established in 1962 as the Nancy Taylor Secretarial School. In 1986, the institution was acquired by Janice C. Parker, who transitioned the college toward associate degree and certificate programs aligned with workforce needs. Since then, TBI has expanded its academic offerings and institutional mission, receiving regional accreditation in 2017.

=== Level Playing Field Foundation ===
Taylor Business Institute established the Level Playing Field Foundation (LPF) in 2002 as a 501(c)(3) nonprofit organization dedicated to raising scholarship funds and providing supportive services for economically disadvantaged students. The foundation was created to assist primarily minority and underserved adult students pursuing education at TBI, aiming to bridge financial gaps and reduce dependency on student loans. Since its inception, LPF has awarded over $747,000 in scholarships.

== Academics ==
Taylor Business Institute offers Associate of Applied Science degrees. It also offers English as a Second Language (ESL) programs and a program that prepares students for the United States Medical Licensing Examination. The college uses hybrid delivery models that combine in-person and online learning formats.

It is accredited by the Higher Learning Commission and licensed by the Illinois Board of Higher Education.

== Campus and facilities ==
The college is located at 29 East Madison Street in Chicago's historic Heyworth Building. Its campus includes classrooms, computer labs, and administrative offices. In 2025, TBI proposed a classroom extension in Naperville, Illinois, currently pending approval from the Illinois Board of Higher Education (IBHE). The initiative is supported by the Naperville Police Department and aims to advance workforce diversity in law enforcement and public service.

== Leadership and governance ==
Taylor Business Institute is operated by Pan Ethnic International, Inc., an Illinois for-profit corporation. The institution is governed by a board of governors and led by an executive team responsible for academics, compliance, operations, and outreach. Janice C. Parker is the president and chief operating officer.
