= Blue Cliff College =

American technical school

Blue Cliff College is a for-profit technical school that has one main campus, five branch campus locations, and two satellite branches throughout Louisiana and Mississippi. The college offers diplomas for careers in Cosmetology, Esthetics, Health Information Management,Billing and Coding, massage therapy, medical assisting, Dental Assistant and Diagnostic Medical Sonography Program.

The name of the college is taken from an ancient Zen text, the Blue Cliff Record, containing dialogues between Zen masters and their students.

All of the Blue Cliff College campuses include lecture rooms, massage training rooms, administrative offices, lounge areas, and resource rooms for studies; each school has compatible resources and technologies with the programs they offer.

BCC was founded in 1987. In June 1989, the College received its Proprietary School License from the state of Louisiana. In 1998, the College received accreditation from the Accrediting Commission of Career Schools and Colleges (ACCSC). By 2007 Blue Cliff had expanded to the current locations in Alexandria, LA, Houma, LA, Metairie, LA (Cleary Ave.), Lafayette, LA, Metairie, LA (Veterans Memorial Blvd), Shreveport, LA, and Gulfport, MS.

The school was purchased by Education Management, Inc., in 1999, which in turn was acquired by Quad Partners in 2008. On April 26, 2022, Brent L. Mills, Inc., acquired the Blue Cliff College system.
