= Respect Graduate School =

Islamic private school in Bethlehem, Pennsylvania

Coordinates: 40.6462°N 75.4246°W

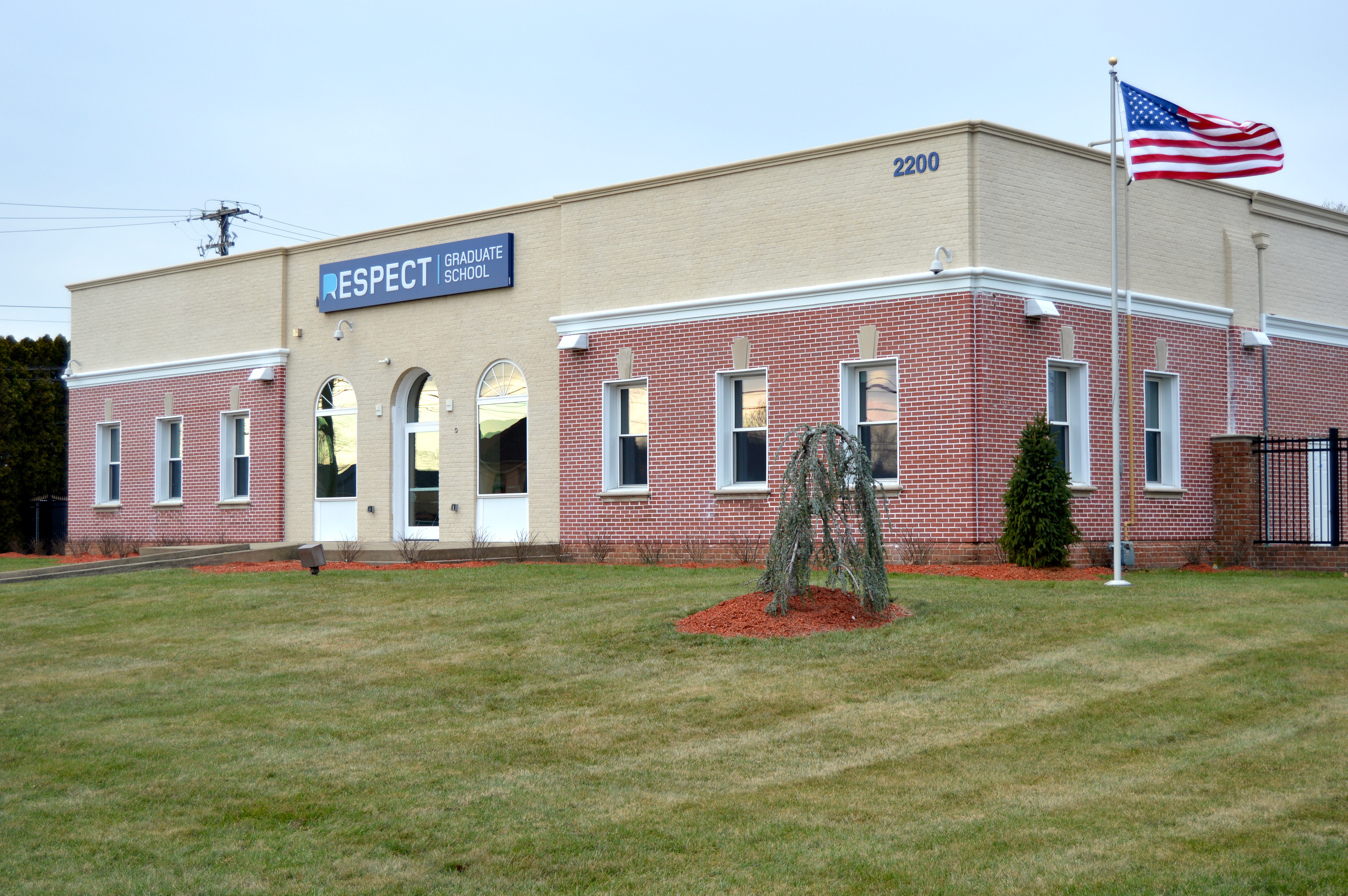
- Respect Graduate School in January 2016
- Type: Islamic Graduate School
- Established: 2015
- Director: Suleyman Eris
- Location: Bethlehem, Pennsylvania, United States
- Website: www.respectgs.us

Respect Graduate School is a private Islamic graduate school located in Bethlehem, Pennsylvania. The school opened in 2015 and is currently focused on offering a Master of Arts in Islamic studies (MAIS) degree.

The MAIS degree program at Respect Graduate School (RGS) offers two tracks of study for students. Students may choose from either the Academic or the Professional track of the program to complete their study. The academic track of the MAIS program is designed for students who aim to continue their education onto the Ph.D. level in preparation for an academic career.

The professional track of the program, on the other hand, is for students who are interested in a wider array of careers such as Islamic ministry, chaplaincy, education, Islamic finance, inter-religious relations, international relations, or journalism. RGS is dedicated to promoting interfaith and intrafaith dialogue and holds regular events open to the public in cooperation with the Lehigh Dialogue Center and Moravian Theological Seminary at Moravian University.

RGS also offers a summer program called Al-Mizan Summer Youth Institute that aims to prepare high school aged students for college.
