= Fox College =

- Motto: Finish First
- Type: Private for-profit college
- President: Jackie Flynn
- Academic staff: 32
- Students: 474
- Location: Tinley Park, Illinois, United States; 41.7715°N 87.7447°W
- Website: www.foxcollege.edu

Fox College is a private for-profit college with its main campus in Tinley Park, Illinois. It was founded in 1932.

== Academics ==
Fox College provides career-focused courses to high school graduates. The programs are accelerated in nature and operate on a year-round calendar.

== Accreditation ==
Fox College is accredited by the Higher Learning Commission.
