= Institute of Clinical Acupuncture and Oriental Medicine =

- Established: 1996; 30 years ago
- President: Dr. Wai Hoa Low
- Location: Honolulu, Hawaii, United States
- Nickname: ICAOM
- Website: http://www.orientalmedicine.edu

The Institute of Clinical Acupuncture and Oriental Medicine (ICAOM), located in Honolulu, Hawaii, United States, offers master's and postgraduate doctoral degrees in acupuncture and Oriental medicine. ICAOM's programs are accredited by the Accreditation Commission for Acupuncture and Herbal Medicine, and approved by the Hawaii State Board of Acupuncture.

The school is also a member of the National Network of Libraries of Medicine and the Council of Colleges of Acupuncture and Oriental Medicine, while licensed by the State of Hawaii Department of Commerce and Consumer Affairs and the State of Hawaii Department of Education.

The teaching clinic at ICAOM provides instruction to students and medical care to the local population using the modalities of acupuncture, herbal medicine, tui na, cupping, moxibustion and lifestyle counseling.
