= Huntsville Bible College =

College in Huntsville, Alabama, United States

- Type: Private
- Established: 1986
- President: Lyle M. Lee
- Academic staff: 13
- Students: 72
- Location: Huntsville, Alabama, United States; 34°45′2″N 86°35′42″W
- Campus: Urban
- Website: www.hbc1.edu

Huntsville Bible College is a non-denominational Christian seminary in Huntsville, Alabama. Founded in 1986, the college offers both associate degrees and bachelor's degrees in Christian Education, Mission and Evangelism, and Pastoral Ministry, as well as a bachelor's in Theology. With 72 students and 13 faculty members, it is one of the smallest post-secondary institutes in Alabama.
