= Miami Regional University =

Private college in Florida, United States

Coordinates: 26.1860081°N 80.1638119°W

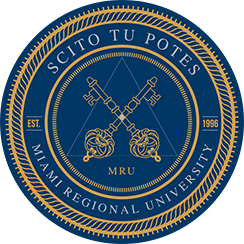
- Former names: Management Resources Institute (2001); Management Resources College (2014); Miami Regional College (2016)
- Motto: Scito tu potes
- Motto in English: Know you can
- Type: Private for-profit university
- Established: 1996
- Accreditation: SACSCOC
- President: Ophelia Sanchez
- Location: Miami Springs, Florida, United States
- Colors: Gold and Blue
- Mascot: Zuca
- Website: www.mru.edu

Miami Regional University (MRU) is a private for-profit university in Miami Springs, Florida. MRU is accredited by the Southern Association of Colleges and Schools Commission on Colleges.

== History ==
The original company was founded in 1996 and originally as a management consulting, training and human development institution. In 1999, the company partnered with Miami-Dade WAGES Coalition (later known as CareerSource South Florida) and started training welfare and dislocated clients. Eventually the organization expanded its partnership ventures to include CareerSource Broward, Vocational Rehabilitation, and the Veterans Administration.

In 2001, Management Resources Institute (MRI) was founded as a DBA, and the institution was licensed by the Florida Commission of Independent Education (CIE). It was during this period that MRI developed a curriculum to prepare college graduates of foreign origin to become certified teachers of the state of Florida. In 2007, the Council on Occupational Education (COE) granted MRI six years of accreditation. The US Department of Education (USDOE) approved MRI to administer Federal Financial Aid in 2008. COE accredited the institution for another six years after a re-affirmation visit in August 2012.

MRI introduced an Associate of Science Degree in Nursing in February 2012, and this became its most popular academic offering to date. In 2014, COE and CIE approved MRI's request to change its name to Management Resources College (MRC). Later that year, the school was accredited by ACICS to offer four-year degrees.

In 2019, it became Miami Regional University.
