= Sumner College =

Sumner College is a private for-profit nursing school in Portland, Oregon. It was founded in 1974.

== History ==
Sumner College began in 1974 with one campus located in Portland, the college began as The Court Reporting Institute. Founded by Bill Ellis, the school was located near Portland State University with the focus to train students to become proficient court reporters to support the legal community. In 1986, the college changed its name to the College of Legal Arts, and expanded its curriculum by adding a Legal Secretarial Program and in 1988 a Paralegal Program. In 1995 the school moved locations and added a Medical Transcription program, its first program in the medical field. In 2007 the college was purchased by Cascade Education, LLC. Under the new ownership the college began to develop new programs for the healthcare industry. In 2009, the college changed its name to Sumner College and launched its first nursing program. In 2012 the college was approved to offer an associate level Registered Nursing Program (AAS) by the state of Oregon and the Oregon State Board of Nursing, becoming the second proprietary school in the state. In 2020 Sumner College starting offering its first 100% online course in RN to BSN.In 2023 Sumner College began offering the Bachelor of Science in Nursing Degree program.

== Campuses ==
Sumner College has two locations: the main one in Portland and a branch campus opened in Bend, Oregon, in February 2025.

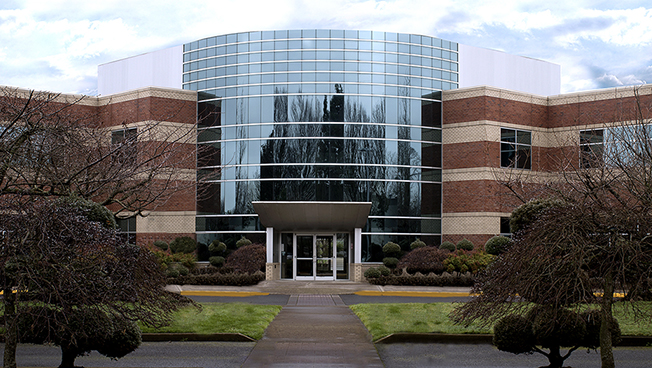
Cascade Campus, Portland, OR

The Portland Sumner College Cascade Campus is located at 8338 NE Alderwood Rd. Suite #100 Portland, Oregon 97220 and offers Registered Nursing, Practical Nursing, RN to BSN and Bachelor of Science in Nursing programs.

== Accreditation ==
The nursing school is accredited by the Accrediting Council for Health Education Schools (ABHES) The RN to BSN (Bachelor of Science) degree is accredited by the Commission on Collegiate Nursing Education (CCNE). December 2021 The Bachelor of Science in Nursing Degree is accredited by CCNE Commission on Collegiate Nursing Education, ABHES Accrediting Bureau of Health Education Schools and Approved by the Oregon State Board of Nursing.
