= Wisconsin School of Professional Psychology =

Private graduate school in Milwaukee, Wisconsin, U.S.

Coordinates: 43°06′19.4″N 88°01′36.6″W

- Type: Private
- Established: 1978
- President: Dr. Brian Smothers
- Dean: Dr. Kris Juergens
- Faculty: 16
- Students: 75
- Doctoral students: 75
- Location: Milwaukee, Wisconsin, United States
- Website: wspp.edu

Wisconsin School of Professional Psychology (WSPP) is a private graduate school in Milwaukee, Wisconsin. It was founded in 1978 and awards doctoral degrees in clinical psychology.

== History ==
Wisconsin School of Professional Psychology (WSPP) was founded in 1978 by a group of southeastern Wisconsin psychologists who believed that post-secondary institutions were not meeting the demand for clinical psychologists. Accepting its first students in 1980, WSPP's first faculty was composed of practicing psychologists in Milwaukee.

It became accredited in February 1987 by the North Central Association of Colleges and Schools (NCA). Along with the NCA, WSPP is also accredited by the American Psychological Association.
