= Gurnick Academy =

Private medical school in California

Coordinates: 37.54722°N 122.30802°W

Gurnick Academy of Medical Arts
- Motto: Integrate. Empower. Achieve.
- Type: Private For-Profit Education
- Established: 2004
- Founders: Konstantin Gourji
- Officer in charge: Konstantin Gourji
- Location: San Jose, California, U.S.
- Campus: 6 campuses and online
- Website: www.gurnick.edu
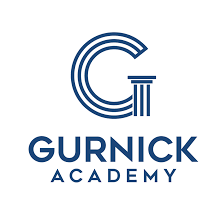

Gurnick Academy (also known as Gurnick Academy of Medical Arts) is a private for-profit higher-education institution in California providing nursing, imaging and allied health programs. The school's corporate office is located in San Jose, California, and it operates six campuses, in San Jose, Concord, Modesto, Fresno, Sacramento and Los Angeles, as well as offering distance education online. The academy is operated and owned by the Gurnick Academy of Medical Arts, with Konstantin Gourji as the chief executive officer.

== History ==
Gurnick Academy of Medical Arts was established in February 2004 in San Mateo, California. The school's headquarters and main campus have moved to San Jose, CA, as of January 2024. As of January 2024, Gurnick Academy operates six campuses in addition to online distance-learning programs and courses. Los Angeles’ school site in Van Nuys was the sixth campus approved by the Accrediting Bureau of Health Education Schools in September 2019.

== Academics ==
Gurnick Academy provides a variety of courses, from continuing education certificates to diplomas and degree programs, combining theoretical training with practical and clinical components. There are over 1,600 students enrolled full-time across six campuses at any given moment. Gurnick Academy has more than 300 faculty staff members with a student/faculty ratio of 8:1.

== Accreditations and memberships ==
As of 2024, Gurnick Academy holds the following accreditations and memberships:

- Approved to operate by the California Bureau for Private Postsecondary Education
- National accreditation from the Accrediting Bureau of Health Education Schools and listed with the National Council of State Boards of Nursing
- Member of the California Association of Private Postsecondary Schools
- Member of the Chamber of Commerce
- Approved by the United States Department of Education to participate in Title IV/Federal Financial Aid programs including Pell Grants
- Approved as an eligible institution to train Veterans and eligible persons, enabling Veterans and their eligible dependents/spouses to utilize their G. I. Bill benefits to train to become Career Healthcare Professionals;
- Approved to accept participants from Workforce Investment Act, Employment Development Department and California counties retraining programs;
- The San Jose campus is approved by Student and Exchange Visitor Program to accept international students.

In addition, individual programs offered by the Gurnick Academy have received accreditation or recognition from the other governmental regulatory bodies and organizations including Nursing B.S. Degree, Vocational Nurse Program Nurse Assistant Program, Physical Therapist Assistant Program, Magnetic Resonance Imaging Program, Ultrasound Technology Program, Radiologic Technology Program and more.

== Facilities ==
In addition to classrooms, the facilities available on the campuses of Gurnick Academy of Medical Arts include:

- Imaging labs equipped with ultrasound scanners with 3D and color-flow imaging capacity
- Patient-care labs equipped with hospital beds, anatomical models, and interactive simulation mannequins
- Medical assistant labs, complete with scales, EKG machines, urine and blood testing equipment
- Physical therapy labs, equipped with hi-lo treatment tables and exercise equipment
- Phlebotomy lab, with anatomical charts and models in addition to specimen collection equipment and supplies
- Energized radiologic technology lab, equipped with stationary and portable radiography units and a digital image receptor system

== Student life and community service ==
Gurnick Academy has a recorded history of community service, with students, faculty, and staff participating in charity events such as fundraising and volunteering, including Salvation Army assistance, partnering with city authorities on aid to the seniors (also during coronavirus quarantine) and more.

== Locations ==
- San Jose Campus (previously San Mateo campus, est. 2004)
- Concord Campus (est. 2005)
- Modesto Campus (est. 2008)
- Fresno Campus (est. 2008)
- Sacramento Campus (est. 2017)
- Los Angeles Campus (est. 2019)
