= Baptist Convention of New England =

Network of churches in America

The Baptist Churches of New England (BCNE) is a network of churches located in New England and affiliated with the Southern Baptist Convention. Headquartered in Northborough, Massachusetts, the convention is made up of around 370 churches as of 2018. The Baptist Churches of New England was founded in 1983 and subscribes to the theological beliefs expressed in The Baptist Faith and Message (2000).

== Affiliated organizations ==
- Baptist Foundation of New England
