= Western Kentucky University-Owensboro =

Public university in Owensboro, Kentucky

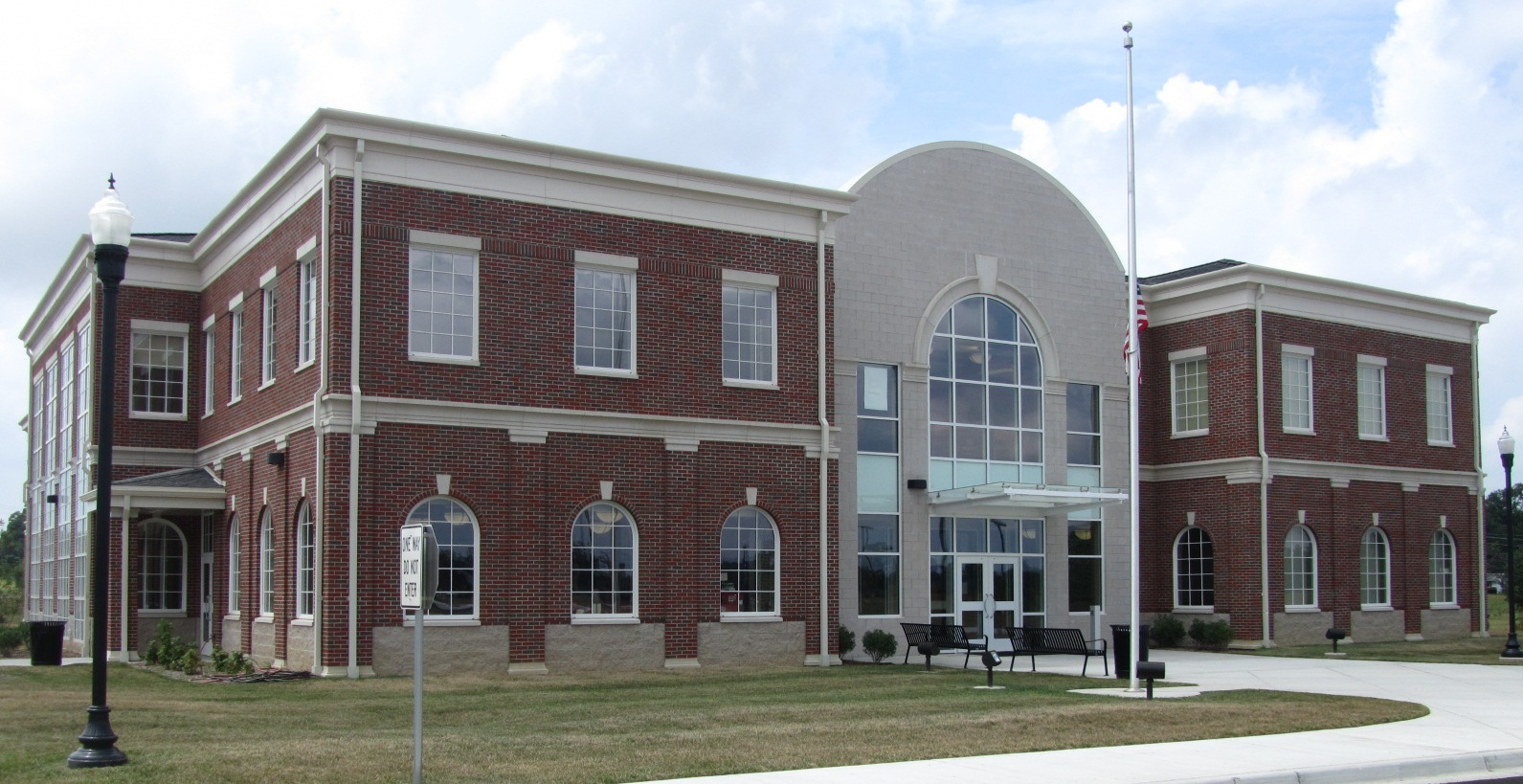
- Western Kentucky University - Owensboro campus, dedicated spring 2010
- Type: Public
- Established: 1980
- Location: Owensboro, Kentucky, USA; 37.7177°N 87.0782°W
- Campus: 27 acres (110,000 m^{2})
- Colors: Red and White
- Mascot: Big Red
- Website: www.wku.edu/owensboro

Western Kentucky University-Owensboro is a regional campus of Western Kentucky University offering public, post-secondary education. It offers 23 undergraduate degrees, partnering with the Kentucky Community and Technical College System in a +2 program wherein students can transfer to WKU in Owensboro to complete an undergraduate degree after earning their associate degree. WKU in Owensboro is located at 4821 New Hartford Road, across the street from the Owensboro Community and Technical College main campus and minutes south of the Ohio River. WKU in Owensboro offers benefits of a public university while maintaining personal student/staff relationships and a sense of community.

== History ==
Western Kentucky University's presence in Owensboro dates to 1969. At that time offices were established on the campus of Kentucky Wesleyan College and classes were conducted at Kentucky Wesleyan and Brescia University, concentrating primarily on graduate courses. As the demand for a public university alternative in the Daviess County (KY) area increased, undergraduate courses in nursing and education were added to the course schedule. In July, 1980, the WKU in Owensboro campus was established. As a result of growing enrollment, operations were moved to the Longfellow Building north of Owensboro High School, and classes were held there and on the high school campus. After 16 years at the Longfellow location, increasing enrollment forced another change in venue. In 2005, the WKU in Owensboro campus moved to the main campus of Owensboro Community and Technical College. Classes were also conducted at the Owensboro Community and Technical College southeast campus.

In 2007, and agreement between Daviess County Fiscal Court and Western Kentucky University provided land and earmarked funds for a permanent facility for the WKU in Owensboro campus. The 30,000-square-foot (2,800 m^{2}) state-of-the-art facility, located at 4821 New Hartford Road, was dedicated in the spring of 2010. The campus has classrooms with WKU Connect capability and two conference rooms which are available to businesses and organizations to host meetings, trainings, and conferences. Conference rooms offer audio/visual equipment for teleconferencing. The campus also has a computer lab, collaborative study areas for students, a student lounge, administrative offices, and a beautiful outdoor space.

== Joint admissions ==
According to an agreement between WKU and area community colleges, students can now enjoy the benefits of joint admission. Through joint admission, students begin their WKU experience while earning their associate degree at Owensboro Community and Technical College or Madisonville Community College. Joint students utilize services at the WKU in Owensboro campus, including academic advising, computer labs and library. Students also receive a WKU student ID which provides admission to WKU athletic events. Credits earned at WKU and the student's community college transfer between schools upon completion of each semester at no charge to the student. Joint admission offers a smooth transition from the community college to WKU. Further information is available by calling 270-684-9797 to speak with an advisor.

== Academics ==
Transfer students can complete a bachelor's degree at WKU in Owensboro, in Bowling Green, online, or through a hybrid format. Degrees in Criminology, Elementary Education, Special Education/Elementary Education (dual certification), Engineering Technology Management, Healthcare Administration, Health Sciences, Interdisciplinary Studies, Management - Business Administration, Middle Grades Education, Professional Legal Studies, Psychology, Public Health, Social Work, and Sociology are offered through a combination of in-person and online course formats. Numerous undergraduate, graduate, certificates, and minors are also offered through WKU in Owensboro. A complete list of academic programs is available at https://www.wku.edu/regionalcampuses/owensboro/academic_programs.php. Undergraduate degrees can be earned through a program in which students complete associate degree work at a Kentucky Community and Technical College facility, then transfer to WKU in Owensboro for the remaining two years of undergraduate work. The +2 program has proven quite popular and successful. Since the inception of this program in 2005, WKU in Owensboro enrollment has increased over 40%.

== Student body ==
The majority of students are adult learners age 25 or over. Many have jobs and families which make the flexibility of a regional campus more convenient for them than a traditional college experience where students live and attend all classes on their college campus.
