= Seattle Bible College =

College in Everett, Washington, U.S.

- Type: Private
- Established: 1955
- Religious affiliation: Sonrise Christian Center, Everett, Washington, U.S. Fellowship of Christian Assemblies
- President: Dan C. Hammer
- Vice-president: Tom Gibbons
- Dean: Kathleen M. Troll
- Location: Everett, Washington, U.S. 47°57′48″N 122°12′02″W
- Campus: Urban
- Website: seattlebiblecollege.edu

Seattle Bible College (SBC) is a four-year Bible college in Everett, Washington, United States. It offers theological and church ministry degrees. It was founded in 1955 and is associated with Philadelphia Church in Seattle which is associated with the Fellowship of Christian Assemblies.

== History ==
During the summer of 2006, SBC moved 20 miles (32 km) north of its original Seattle, which was adjacent to the Philadelphia Church location to Sonrise Chapel in south Everett, Washington. In 2007 a graduate studies division of SBC was established–the Cross-National Graduate School of Leadership.

In 2009, SBC moved to the Mill Creek campus of Christian Faith Center co-pastored by televangelists Casey and Wendy Treat, and a “blending” process began with Vision College, a training ministry of Christian Faith Center. In 2010, Vision College became a “vocational studies division” of Seattle Bible College, and Pastor Casey Treat was confirmed as president of Seattle Bible College, Inc. By fall 2011, SBC blended with Vision College. In June 2013, Treat resigned (he and his wife Wendy are alumumi of the college) resigned and during the summer of 2013, SBC went to its present Sonrise Christian Center in Everett.

Dan Hammer is SBC President and he has a D.Min from Bakke University. In 2014 the church's one-year training ministry transitioned into a program track of Seattle Bible College.
