= Wayland Baptist University (Alaska) =

College campus in Alaska, United States

Coordinates: 61°11′32″N 149°44′07″W

Wayland Baptist University (Alaska) was an extension of Wayland Baptist University, a private, coeducational Baptist university based in Plainview, Texas. It maintained external campuses in Anchorage and Fairbanks, Alaska.

Wayland Baptist University - Anchorage was established in 1985 (40 years ago). The Anchorage campus was located at 7801 E. 32nd Ave at the corner of E. 32nd Ave. and Old Muldoon Road. The Anchorage campus operated teaching sites in Wasilla, JBER-Richardson, and JBER-Elmendorf.

The Fairbanks campus was established in 1985 at Eielson Air Force Base as an extension of the Alaska campus in Anchorage and began to operate independently in 1999. The Fairbanks campus also operated teaching sites in Fort Wainwright, AK and North Pole, AK.

In 2025 the university Board of Trustees elected to move all Alaska teaching to online due to the demand for remote learning in that state.
