= Methodist College (Illinois) =

Private college in Peoria, Illinois, US

- Motto: Ars Et Scientia
- Type: Private
- Established: March 2000; 26 years ago
- Parent institution: UnityPoint Health
- Accreditation: HLC
- Religious affiliation: None
- Chancellor: Kayla Banks
- Academic staff: 72
- Total staff: 47
- Students: 595
- Location: 7600 N. Academic Drive, Peoria, Illinois, 61615, US; 40.780°N 89.683°W
- Campus: Urban
- Website: www.methodistcol.edu
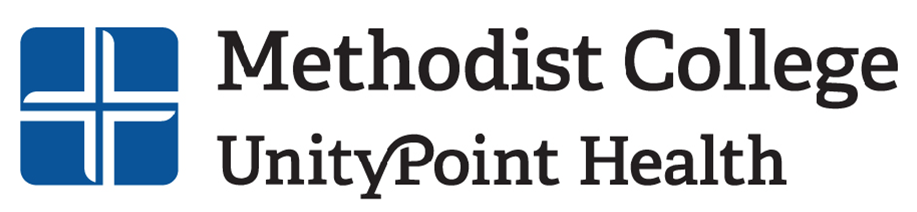

Methodist College is a four-year, private college in Peoria, Illinois. It is affiliated with Carle Health and focuses on healthcare related coursework. It is accredited by the Higher Learning Commission since its founding in 2008. The college offers bachelor and master of science degrees, and certificate programs in nursing, social work, healthcare management, and health sciences.

The college traces its origin to the Deaconess Home and Hospital opened in 1900. The college is not affiliated with the United Methodist Church.

Methodist College is served by CityLink. Route 3 provides bus service between campus and downtown Peoria. Since 2024, Methodist College has been involved in a Federal lawsuit for violating Title IX towards an immigrant US citizen. The case is currently ongoing, involving at least eight current and departed staff members. Following the identification of racial discrimination and poor treatment of the student, the Chancellor resigned, and her replacement was brought in last year.

== See also ==
- Bradley University
