= San Diego University for Integrative Studies =

Coordinates: 32.752°N 117.196°W

- Other names: SDUIS
- Established: 1999
- Location: Old Town, San Diego, California, United States
- Website: www.sduis.edu

San Diego University for Integrative Studies (SDUIS) is a small private university in San Diego, California, United States. It was established in 1999

SDUIS campus is located at 2725 Congress St. Suite 2M in Old Town, San Diego. It also offers a distance learning program. The school currently offers certificate programs.

== Suspension of State Approval ==
In December 2021, the California State Bureau for Private Postsecondary Education suspended its approval for SDUIS to operate its degree programs only, but not its certificate programs.
