= Nebo, Georgia =

Unincorporated community in Georgia, U.S.

Coordinates: 33.838443°N 84.831842°W

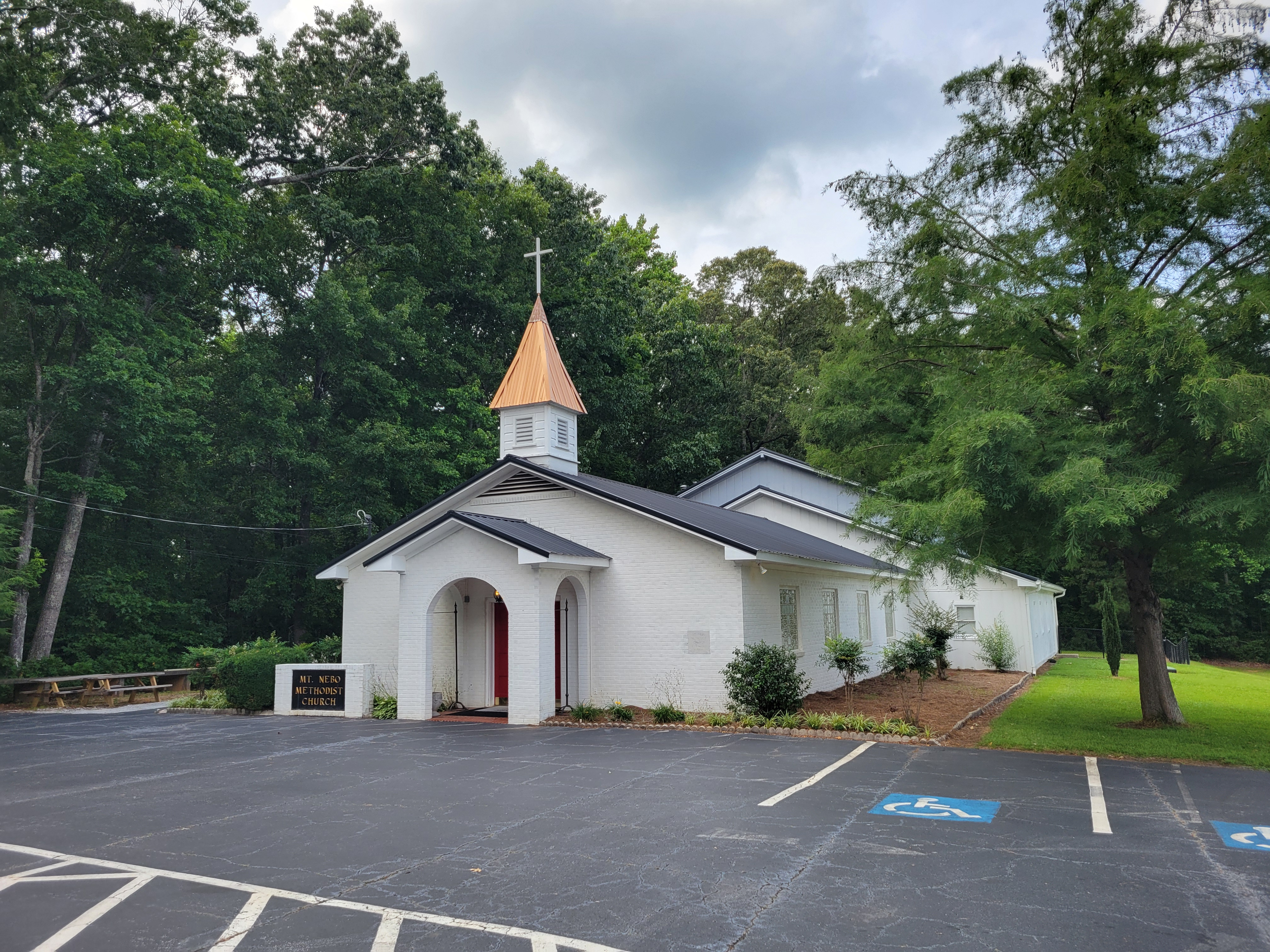
Mount Nebo Methodist Church

Nebo is an unincorporated community in Paulding County, Georgia, United States, located at the crossroads of Nebo Road and Dallas Nebo Road near the cities of Dallas and Hiram.
