= Paulding Northwest Atlanta Airport =

Airport in Dallas, Georgia, United States

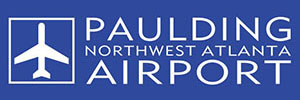

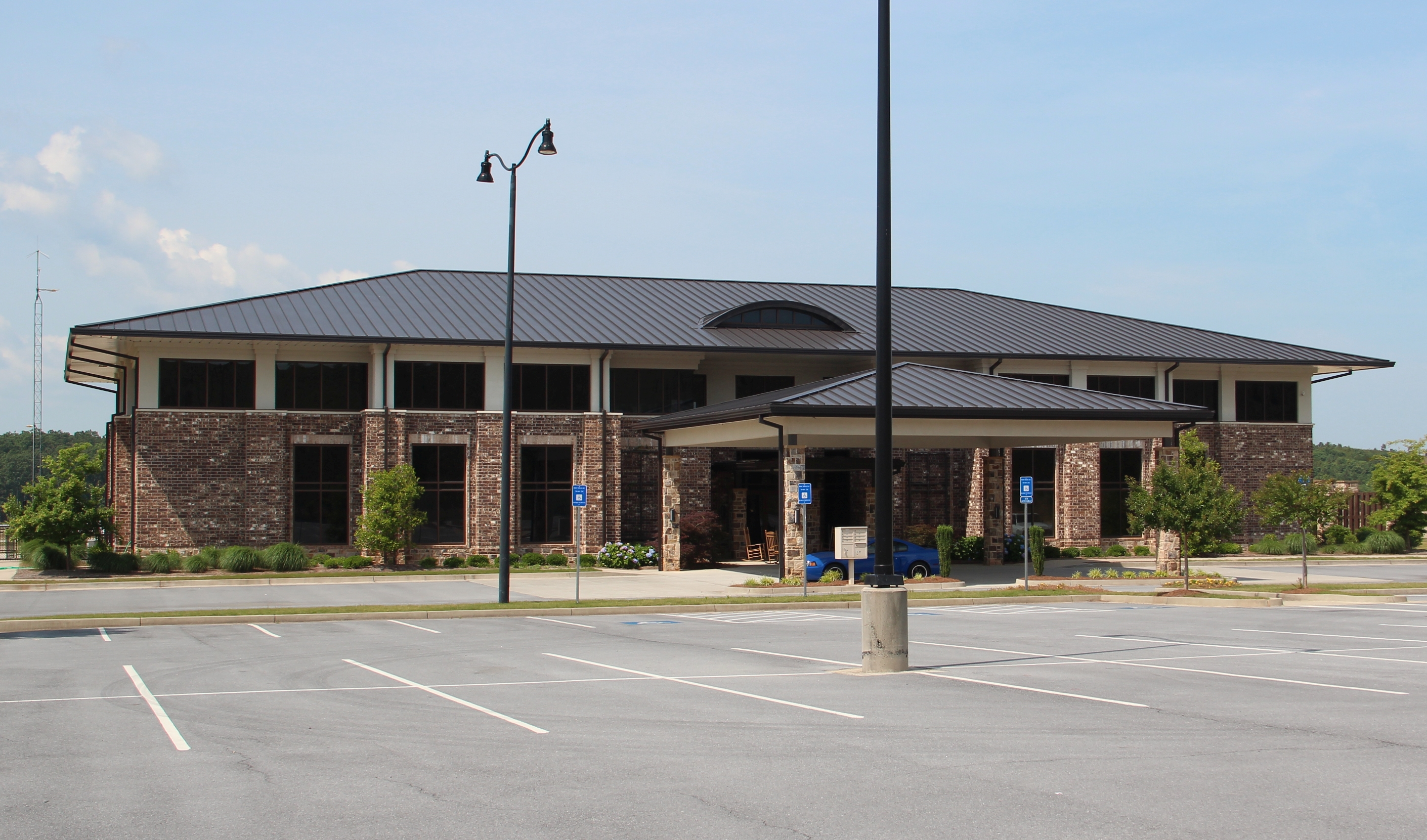
- IATA: none; ICAO: KPUJ; FAA LID: PUJ

Summary
- Airport type: Public
- Owner: Paulding County Board of Commissioners
- Serves: Metro Atlanta
- Location: Dallas, Georgia
- Elevation AMSL: 1,289 ft / 393 m
- Coordinates: 33°54′43″N 084°56′26″W
- Website: www.pauldingairport.com

Map
- Location of airport in Georgia

Runways
Direction	Length		Surface
Direction	ft	m	Surface
13/31	5,505	1,678	Concrete

Statistics
- Based aircraft: 11
- Sources: Airport, FAA, Georgia DOT

The Paulding Northwest Atlanta Airport (ICAO: KPUJ, FAA LID: PUJ) — formerly known as Silver Comet Field and Paulding County Regional Airport — is a small public-use airport in Paulding County, Georgia, United States. The airport is located in the city of Dallas, Georgia, 30 miles (48 km) northwest of Atlanta. It is owned by the Paulding County Board of Commissioners, and is included in the National Plan of Integrated Airport Systems for 2011–2015, which categorized it as a general aviation facility.

Although many U.S. airports use the same three-letter location identifier for the FAA and IATA, Paulding Northwest Atlanta Airport is assigned PUJ by the FAA but has no designation from the IATA (which assigned PUJ to Punta Cana International Airport in Punta Cana, Dominican Republic).

== History ==
In 1975, in anticipation of a second international airport, the city of Atlanta purchased 10,165 acres (41.14 km^{2}) of land in Paulding for $925 per acre. In early 2007, the county purchased 162 acres (0.7 km^{2}) of the property for the new general aviation airport.

Paulding County is unserved by either rapid transit or freeways. The airport's location is on the Rockmart Highway (U.S. Route 278), approximately 25 mi (40 km) from the nearest interstate and 40 mi (64 km) from Midtown Atlanta.

Construction was completed in late 2008. It is the ninth local airport in metro Atlanta, and the first new jet-capable airport in Georgia since 1975. To date, more than $70 million has gone into the construction and development of the airport: roughly $10 million from Paulding County directly, $55 million in Federal Aviation Administration grants, and $7 million in state funding. It is anticipated that economic development activity at the airport could result in more than $350 million in annual economic activity and thousands of jobs for Paulding County over the next decade.

=== 2012 hangar collapse ===
On February 22, 2012, one worker was killed and another was injured by the collapse of the second hangar during construction work. Construction of this hangar had been previously delayed in December 2011, when it was discovered that the hangar's concrete slab was not level.

=== 2012 tornado ===
On the night of March 2, 2012, during the tornado outbreak of March 2–3, 2012, the airport was struck by an EF3 tornado that tore a 12-mile (19 km) path across the county. Several million dollars in damage was done, including $1.5 million to the facility, and $5 million to the aircraft parked and stored there, most of which were destroyed (between 18 and 23 aircraft). The hangar was so severely damaged, it had to be torn down and rebuilt. The airport was closed until cleanup and essential repairs were completed.

Repairs to the terminal building were completed in October 2012. The airport became operational with aircraft activity near levels documented prior to the March 2012 tornado, though the airport's only charter service ceased operations. This was the first time that a local airport had been struck by a tornado since Atlanta Speedway Airport in 2005..

=== Attempted privatization ===
On October 4, 2013, Paulding County announced a Public Private Partnership with Propeller Investments, llc (doing business as Silver Comet Terminal Partners, llc) to further develop the airport, with an intent to provide commercial passenger services. This was opposed by local residents, to whom the head of the Paulding County Airport Authority had previously promised that the airport would remain a general aviation airport. Consequently, residents filed several lawsuits addressing violations of Georgia's freedom of information laws, and an ultra vires suit against the Paulding County Industrial Building Authority for overextending its authority. Some of these lawsuits were filed by attorneys associated with Delta Air Lines.

In October 2013, residents filed a legal challenge against bond funding for a taxiway expansion, and a second legal challenge in November, questioning the Federal Aviation Administration (FAA) environmental approvals of the planned expansions. In December, the court ruled in favor of the airport and county in the bond funding case; residents pledged to appeal. A settlement was announced for the FAA case, calling for an environmental assessment, postponing the commercialization of the airport. In January 2014, residents filed a third legal challenge regarding airport leases and a loan funding the taxiway expansion.

By 2015, anti-privatization politicians had been elected to the Paulding County Commission, straining the private industry relations, and by 2018, the Airport Authority terminated the partnership. Plans for a In 2021, a judge upheld the county's cancellation of the agreements and the companies appealed. Ground was broken on an aviation maintenance academy run by Chattahoochee Technical College in September 2022.

== Facilities ==
Paulding Northwest Atlanta Airport covers an area of 164 acres (66 ha) at an elevation of 1,289 feet (393 m) above mean sea level. It has one southeast–northwest runway designated 13/31 which measures 5,505 by 100 feet (1,678 m × 30 m). Made of concrete, it is capable of landing aircraft up to 50,000 pounds (22,680 kg) for single-wheel landing gear, and 90,000 pounds (40,823 kg) for dual-wheel.

A new, 20,000-square-foot (1,900 m^{2}) terminal building was opened in May 2010, along with the airport's new fixed-base operator, Paulding Jet Center. The airport also has an AWOS weather station, a rotating beacon, and pilot-activated runway lighting. The runway elevation averages 1,286 feet (392 m) AMSL, ±3 feet (±1m). PUJ offers an ILS and GPS approach on runway 31. The National Weather Service did not carry observations for this location until late 2012 or early 2013.

On October 1, 2020, the Paulding Airport FBO (fixed-base operator) took the place of the former Paulding Jet Center FBO. This new FBO is under the direction of the Paulding County Airport Authority.

== See also ==
- List of airports in Georgia (U.S. state)
