= Morgan Dudley =

American actress

- Born: July 10, 2001 (age 25); Marietta, Georgia, United States
- Occupation: Actress
- Years active: 2019–present

Morgan Dudley is an American actress. She is best known for playing Ella in the fantasy comedy film Descendants: The Rise of Red and for her role of Eurydice in Hadestown.

== Early life ==
Dudley was born in Marietta, Georgia. Dudley grew up in Hiram, Georgia. She attended two high schools. First, she went to Paulding County High School where she first started acting in musicals such as The Addams Family and Beauty and the Beast. She then attended Hiram High School where she started doing community theatre.

== Career ==
Dudley made her on screen debut in the musical comedy film The Prom. Dudley was then cast in the romantic comedy A Tourist's Guide to Love starring Rachael Leigh Cook

Dudleys first main role was as Ella in the fantasy comedy film Descendants: The Rise of Red. She reprises her role in Descendants: Wicked Wonderland in a cameo appearance during a flashback.

In October 2021, she made her Broadway debut as Frankie Healy in Jagged Little Pill. Dudley made her return to the Broadway stage in September 2025 as Eurydice, in Anaïs Mitchell’s Hadestown.

Morgan Dudley also has songs of her own and released her singles Purgatory and better left unsent in 2025.

== Personal life ==
Dudley’s acting idol is Zendaya while she also admires Amandla Stenberg, Keke Palmer, and Meryl Streep. Her favourite film is Charlie and the Chocolate Factory.

== Filmography ==
=== Film ===
Year	Title	Role	Notes
2019	The Prom	Student Dancer	
2023	A Tourist's Guide to Love	Robin	

=== Television ===
Year	Title	Role	Notes
2020	Henry Danger	Princess	Episode: "Captain Drex"
2023	Monarch: Legacy of Monsters	Lyra Mateo	Episode: "Will the Real May Please Stand Up?"
2024	Descendants: The Rise of Red	Ella	TV film
2026	Descendants: Wicked Wonderland	Ella	TV film; Cameo; Uncredited

=== Theatre ===
Year	Title	Role	Notes
2021	Jagged Little Pill	Frankie Healy	Broadway debut - Broadhurst Theatre
2025	Hadestown	Eurydice	Walter Kerr Theatre
2026	Heathers	Heather Duke	New World Stages
