= Trevard Lindley =

American gridiron football player (born 1986)

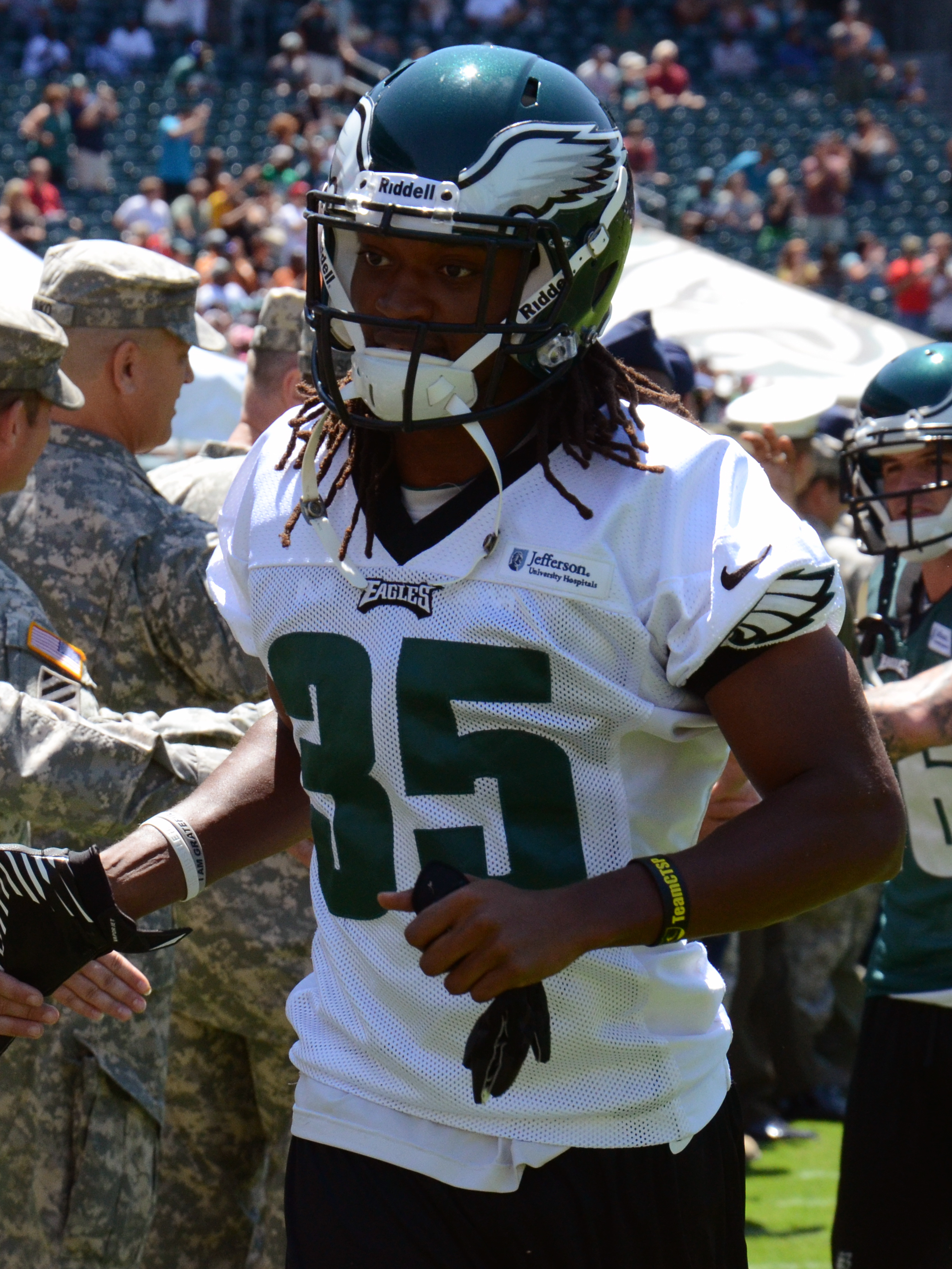
- Lindley with the Philadelphia Eagles in 2013

No. 27, 35
- Position: Cornerback

Personal information
- Born: February 2, 1986 (age 40); Lithia Springs, Georgia, U.S.
- Listed height: 6 ft 0 in (1.83 m)
- Listed weight: 183 lb (83 kg)

Career information
- High school: Hiram (Hiram, Georgia)
- College: Kentucky
- NFL draft: 2010: 4th round, 105th overall pick

Career history
- Philadelphia Eagles (2010–2013); Montreal Alouettes (2013)*; Blacktips (2014)
- * Offseason or practice squad member only

Awards and highlights
- Second-team All-American (2008); First-team All-SEC (2008); Second-team All-SEC (2009)

Career NFL statistics
- Total tackles: 23
- Pass deflections: 1
- Interceptions: 1
- Stats at Pro Football Reference

Trevard Lindley (born February 2, 1986) is an American former professional football player who was a cornerback in the National Football League (NFL). He played college football for the Kentucky Wildcats before being selected by the Philadelphia Eagles in the fourth round of the 2010 NFL draft.

== Professional career ==
=== Pre-draft ===
Prior to the 2010 NFL draft, Lindley was considered one of the top prospects available.

=== Philadelphia Eagles ===
Lindley was selected in the fourth round (105th overall) of the 2010 NFL draft by the Philadelphia Eagles. He was signed to a four-year contract on June 4, 2010.

On September 7, 2011, Lindley was waived by the Eagles. He was re-signed by the team following the 2011 season on January 3, 2012. He was cut again September 1, 2012 to make roster room for former Houston Texans offensive lineman Nathan Menkin.

On January 2, 2013, Lindley re-signed with the Eagles, once again, for the third time. He was released from his contract on August 30, 2013.

=== Montreal Alouettes ===
Lindsey was signed to the practice roster of the Montreal Alouettes on October 10, 2013. He re-signed with the team on January 7, 2014. He was released on June 1, 2014.
