= Smael Mondon Jr. =

American football player (born 2003)

No. 42 – Philadelphia Eagles
- Position: Linebacker
- Roster status: Active

Personal information
- Born: February 13, 2003 (age 23)
- Listed height: 6 ft 2 in (1.88 m)
- Listed weight: 224 lb (102 kg)

Career information
- High school: Paulding County (Dallas, Georgia)
- College: Georgia (2021–2024)
- NFL draft: 2025: 5th round, 161st overall pick

Career history
- Philadelphia Eagles (2025–present)

Career NFL statistics as of 2025
- Tackles: 11
- Stats at Pro Football Reference

Smael Simon Mondon Jr. (SMAY-el; born February 13, 2003) is an American professional football linebacker for the Philadelphia Eagles of the National Football League (NFL). He played college football for the Georgia Bulldogs and was selected by the Eagles in the fifth round of the 2025 NFL draft.

== Early life ==
Mondon Jr. attended Paulding County High School in Dallas, Georgia. A five-star recruit, he played in the 2021 All-American Bowl. He committed to the University of Georgia to play college football.

== College career ==
As a true freshman at Georgia in 2021, Mondon Jr. played in all 15 games as a backup recording 10 tackles and one sack. He took over as a starter his sophomore year in 2022.

== Professional career ==
Pre-draft measurables
Height	Weight	Arm length	Hand span	Wingspan	40-yard dash	10-yard split	20-yard split	Broad jump	Bench press
6 ft 2 1/4 in (1.89 m)	224 lb (102 kg)	31 3/4 in (0.81 m)	9 3/4 in (0.25 m)	6 ft 8 1/8 in (2.04 m)	4.58 s	1.52 s	2.66 s	10 ft 10 in (3.30 m)	25 reps
All values from NFL Combine/Pro Day

Mondon was selected by the Philadelphia Eagles in the fifth round, 161st overall, in the 2025 NFL draft. He appeared in all 17 regular season games for the Eagles in mainly a special teams role.

== Personal life ==
Mondon's parents are from Ivory Coast. Growing up, his first languages were French and English, making him bilingual. He has two siblings. He is cousins with NFL running back Phil Mafah.
