= Jonathan Greenard =

American football player (born 1997)

No. 52 – Philadelphia Eagles
- Position: Outside linebacker
- Roster status: Active

Personal information
- Born: May 25, 1997 (age 29); Hiram, Georgia, U.S.
- Listed height: 6 ft 3 in (1.91 m)
- Listed weight: 263 lb (119 kg)

Career information
- High school: Hiram
- College: Louisville (2015–2018); Florida (2019)
- NFL draft: 2020: 3rd round, 90th overall pick

Career history
- Houston Texans (2020–2023); Minnesota Vikings (2024–2025); Philadelphia Eagles (2026–present)

Awards and highlights
- Pro Bowl (2024); First-team All-SEC (2019)

Career NFL statistics as of Week 9, 2026
- Total tackles: 222
- Sacks: 39.0
- Forced fumbles: 9
- Fumble recoveries: 1
- Pass deflections: 14
- Interceptions: 1
- Defensive touchdowns: 1
- Stats at Pro Football Reference

Jonathan Raymond Greenard (born May 25, 1997) is an American professional football outside linebacker for the Philadelphia Eagles of the National Football League (NFL). He played college football for the Louisville Cardinals and the Florida Gators and was selected by the Houston Texans in the third round of the 2020 NFL draft. Greenard has also played for the Minnesota Vikings.

== Early life ==
Greenard grew up in Hiram, Georgia and attended Hiram High School, where he played basketball and football. As a senior, he was named the 5-A regional defensive player of the year. Rated a three-star recruit, Greenard committed to play college football at Louisville over Kentucky.

== College career ==
Greenard was a member of the Louisville Cardinals, redshirting his true freshman season. He was a key reserve at linebacker as a redshirt freshman recording 22 tackles (seven for loss) and 2.5 sacks along with two passes broken up and an interception, which he returned 42 yards for a touchdown. He made his first career start in the 2016 Citrus Bowl, making five tackles (1.5 for loss). Greenard became a starter for the Cardinals in his redshirt sophomore season and led the team with 15.5 tackles and tied for the team lead with seven sacks. Greenard dislocated his wrist in the first series of first game of his redshirt junior season against Alabama and was forced to miss the entire season. He announced that he would be transferring to the University of Florida at the end of the season.

While injured as a redshirt junior, Greenard took extra courses in order to graduate a semester early and was able to enroll at Florida in January 2019 as a graduate transfer. He was named the Southeastern Conference co-Defensive Lineman of the Week after making six tackles with 1.5 sacks against Miami in his first game as a Gator. Greenard finished the season with 52 tackles, 15.5 tackles for loss and 9.5 sacks with three forced fumbles, a fumble recovery, four passes defended and an interception, earning him first-team All-SEC honors.

== Professional career ==
Pre-draft measurables
Height	Weight	Arm length	Hand span	Wingspan	40-yard dash	10-yard split	20-yard split	20-yard shuttle	Three-cone drill	Vertical jump	Broad jump	Bench press
6 ft 3 3/8 in (1.91 m)	263 lb (119 kg)	34 7/8 in (0.89 m)	9 1/4 in (0.23 m)	6 ft 9 1/4 in (2.06 m)	4.87 s	1.71 s	2.85 s	4.34 s	7.13 s	30.5 in (0.77 m)	9 ft 5 in (2.87 m)	22 reps
All values from NFL Combine

=== Houston Texans ===
Greenard was drafted by the Houston Texans in the third round, 90th overall, of the 2020 NFL draft. On May 14, 2020, Greenard signed a four-year contract with the Texans that included a nearly $900,000 signing bonus. Greenard made his NFL debut on October 4, against the Minnesota Vikings. In Week 11 against the New England Patriots, Greenard recorded his first career sack on Cam Newton during the 27–20 win. Greenard finished his rookie season with 19 tackles, two tackles for loss, and one sack in 13 games played with one start.

On October 22, 2022, Greenard was placed on injured reserve. He was activated on December 17.

=== Minnesota Vikings ===
On March 13, 2024, Greenard signed a four-year, $76 million contract with the Minnesota Vikings. In Week 3 of the 2024 season, Greenard recorded three sacks and four tackles in a 34–7 win over the Houston Texans, earning NFC Defensive Player of the Week.

Greenard made 12 appearances (10 starts) for the Vikings during the 2025 season, recording three pass deflections, one forced fumble, three sacks, and 38 combined tackles. On December 15, head coach Kevin O'Connell announced that Greenard would miss the remainder of the season due to a left shoulder injury that required surgery. He had initially suffered the injury in Week 10 against the Baltimore Ravens, and aggravated the injury in Week 15 against the Dallas Cowboys.

=== Philadelphia Eagles ===
On April 24, 2026, Greenard was traded along with a 2026 seventh-round pick to the Philadelphia Eagles in exchange for a 2026 third-round pick (Jakobe Thomas) and a 2027 third-round pick. Upon being acquired, Greenard signed a four-year, $100 million deal with $50 million guaranteed.

== NFL career statistics ==
Legend
**Bold**	Career high

=== Regular season ===
Year	Team	Games		Tackles					Interceptions						Fumbles			
Year	Team	GP	GS	Cmb	Solo	Ast	Sck	Sfty	PD	Int	Yds	Avg	Lng	TD	FF	FR	Yds	TD
2020	HOU	13	1	19	10	9	1.0	0	1	0	0	0.0	0	0	0	0	0	0
2021	HOU	12	12	33	23	10	8.0	0	**4**	0	0	0.0	0	0	2	0	0	0
2022	HOU	8	4	16	9	7	1.5	0	1	**1**	**39**	**39.0**	**39**	**1**	0	**1**	0	0
2023	HOU	15	15	52	36	16	**12.5**	0	2	0	0	0.0	0	0	1	0	0	0
2024	MIN	**17**	**17**	**59**	**41**	**18**	12.0	0	3	0	0	0.0	0	0	**4**	0	0	0
2025	MIN	12	10	38	19	19	3.0	0	3	0	0	0.0	0	0	1	0	0	0
2026	PHI	6	5	5	3	2	1.0	0	0	0	0	0.0	0	0	1	0	0	0
Career		83	64	222	141	81	39.0	0	14	1	39	39.0	39	1	9	1	0	0

=== Postseason ===
Year	Team	Games		Tackles					Interceptions						Fumbles			
Year	Team	GP	GS	Cmb	Solo	Ast	Sck	Sfty	PD	Int	Yds	Avg	Lng	TD	FF	FR	Yds	TD
2023	HOU	**2**	1	**5**	**4**	1	0.0	0	0	0	0	0.0	0	0	0	0	0	0
2024	MIN	1	1	3	2	1	0.0	0	0	0	0	0.0	0	0	0	0	0	0
Career		3	2	8	6	2	0.0	0	0	0	0	0.0	0	0	0	0	0	0
