= Roberts Elementary School =

Roberts Elementary School may refer to:

Arkansas

- Dr. Don R. Roberts Elementary School - Little Rock, Arkansas - Little Rock School District

Florida

- Roberts Elementary School - Tallahassee, Florida - Leon County Schools

Georgia

- C. A. Roberts Elementary School - Dallas, Georgia - Paulding County School District
- Roberts Elementary School - Suwanee, Georgia - Gwinnett County Public Schools

Massachusetts

- Roberts Elementary School – Medford, Massachusetts

Pennsylvania

- Roberts Elementary School - Wayne, in Upper Merion Township, Pennsylvania - Upper Merion Area School District

Tennessee

- A.H. Roberts Elementary School - Livingston, Tennessee
- Roberts Elementary School - Hardy, Tennessee
- Roberts Elementary School - Hilham, Tennessee
- Roberts Elementary School - Twinton, Tennessee

Texas

- Oran M. Roberts Elementary School - Dallas, Texas - Dallas Independent School District
- Roberts Elementary School - El Paso, Texas - El Paso Independent School District
- Oran M. Roberts Elementary School - Houston, Texas - Houston Independent School District
- Roy W. Roberts Elementary School - Lubbock, Texas - Lubbock Independent School District
- O. M. Roberts Elementary School - Lake Jackson, Texas - Brazosport Independent School District
