= Sudie, Georgia =

Unincorporated community in Georgia, U.S.

Coordinates: 33.8672°N 84.8414°W

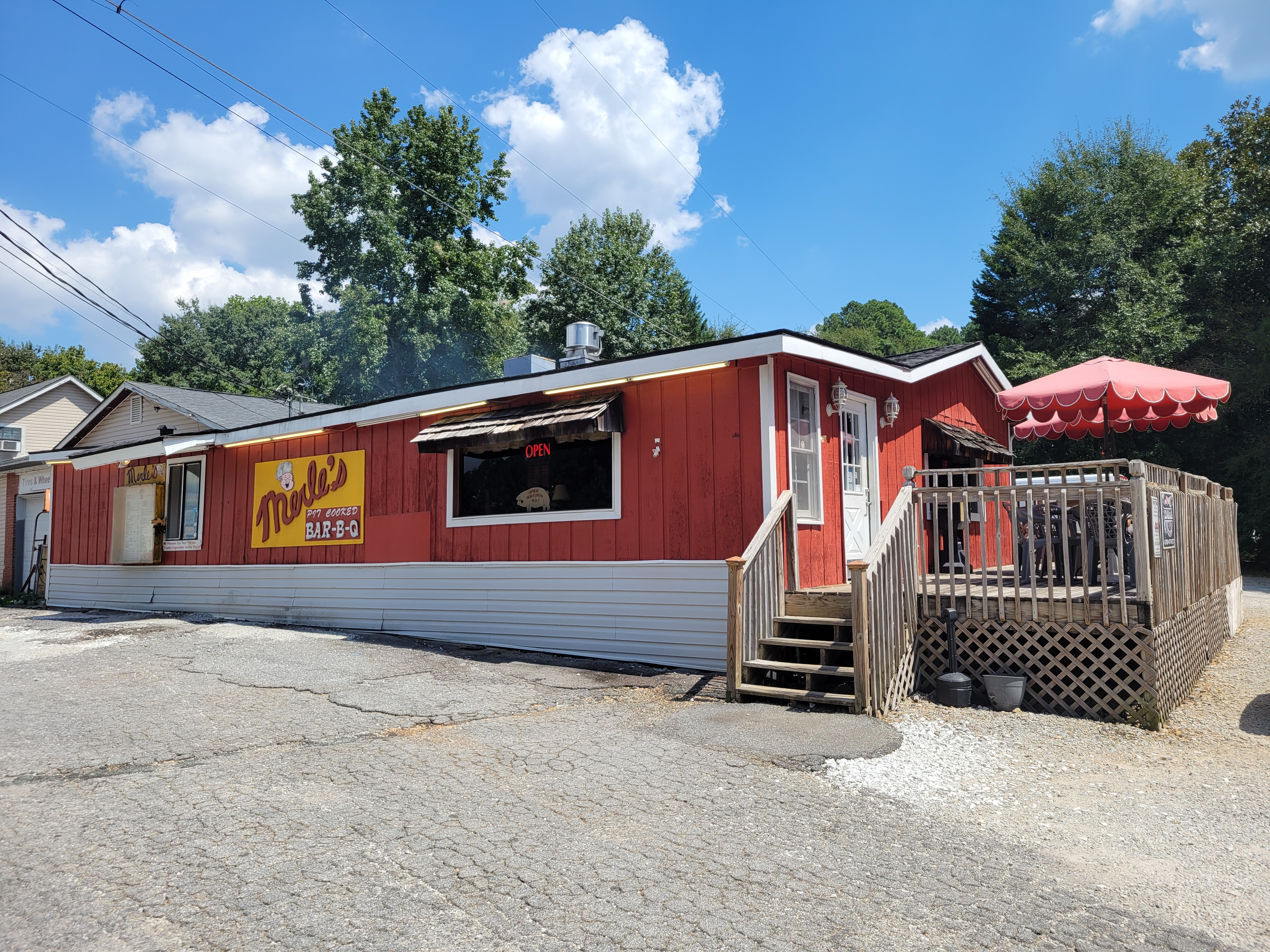
Merle's Bar-B-Q in Sudie

Sudie is an unincorporated community in Paulding County, Georgia, United States, located at the crossroads of Hiram Sudie Road and Villa Rica Highway.

Sudie's location in Georgia
