= Paulding County, Georgia =

County in Georgia, United States

- County
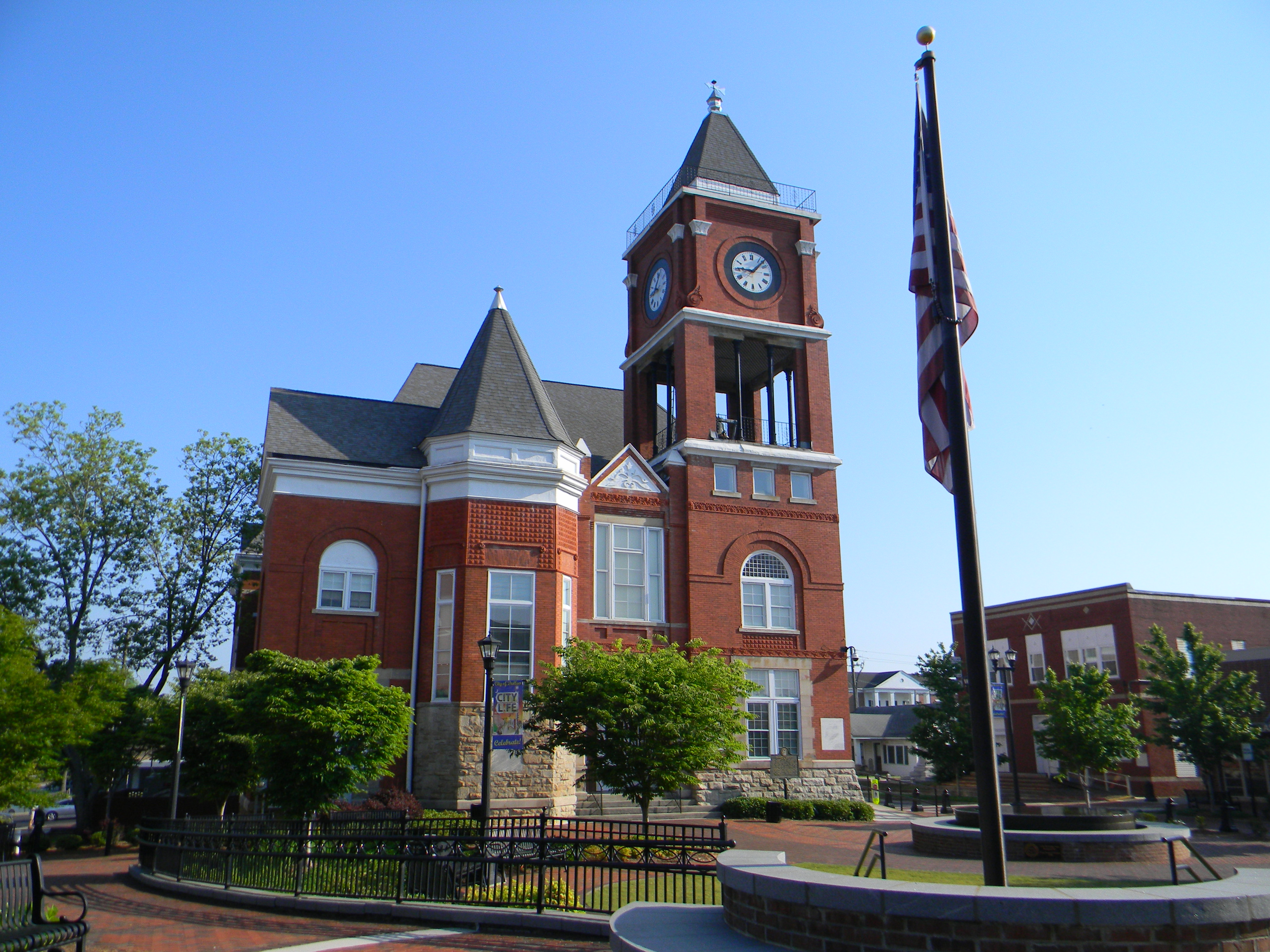
- The Old Paulding County Courthouse in Dallas is listed on the National Register of Historic Places.

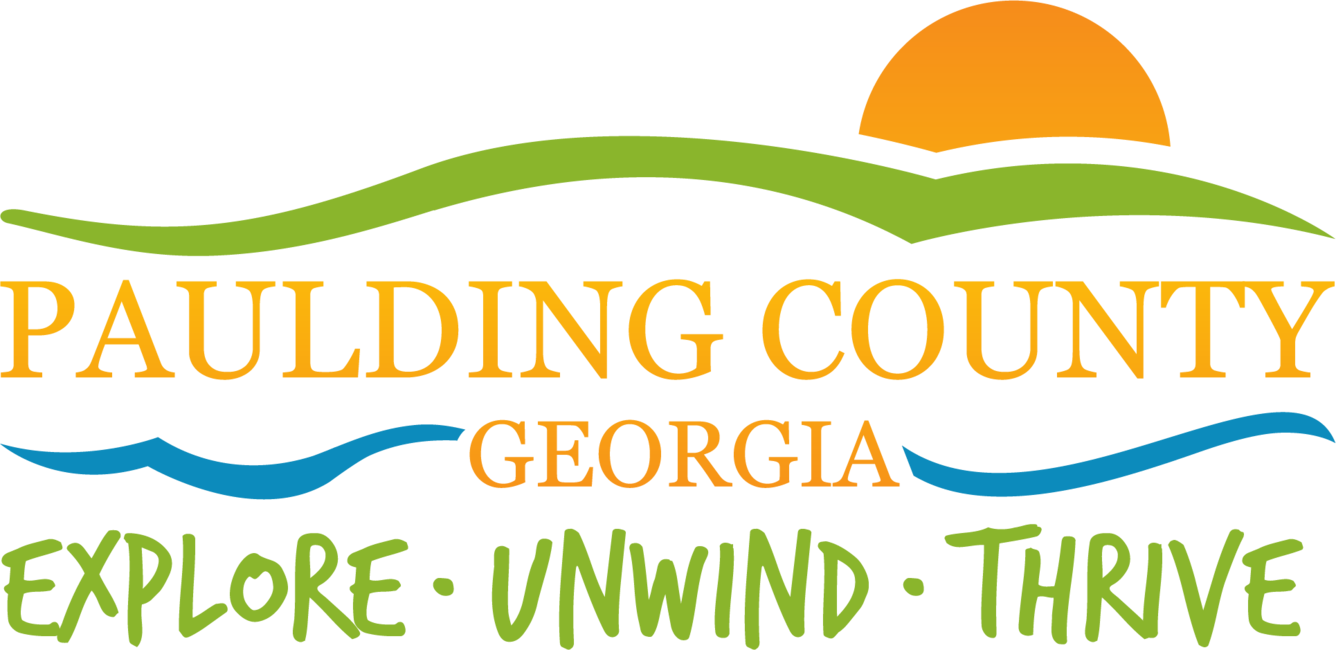
- Seal Logo

- Location within the U.S. state of Georgia
- Coordinates: 33°55′N 84°52′W
- Country: United States
- State: Georgia
- Founded: December 3, 1832; 193 years ago
- Named for: John Paulding
- Seat: Dallas
- Largest city: Dallas

Area
  - Total: 314 sq mi (810 km^{2})
  - Land: 312 sq mi (810 km^{2})
  - Water: 2.1 sq mi (5.4 km^{2}) 0.7%

Population (2020)
  - Total: 168,661
  - Estimate (2025): 190,996 ▲
  - Density: 541/sq mi (209/km^{2})
- Time zone: UTC−5 (Eastern)
  - Summer (DST): UTC−4 (EDT)
- Congressional district: 14th
- Website: paulding.gov

Paulding County is a county in the Northwest region of the U.S. state of Georgia. It had an estimated population of 168,661 in 2020. The county seat is Dallas.

== History ==
Paulding County was created from Cherokee County by an act of the Georgia General Assembly on December 3, 1832. In 1851, a portion of Paulding County was used to help create Polk County. Other portions of Paulding County were annexed to neighboring counties (Campbell, Carroll, Cobb, Douglas, Haralson, and Polk) between 1832 and 1874. Between 1850 and 1874, Paulding County was expanded through annexation of parts of Carroll, Cobb, Douglas, and Polk counties.

The county is named after John Paulding (October 16, 1758 – February 18, 1818), who was famous for the capture of the British spy Major John André in 1780 during the American Revolution. André was on a mission carrying secret papers from Benedict Arnold when he was captured.

== Geography ==
According to the U.S. Census Bureau, the county has a total area of 314 square miles (810 km^{2}), of which 312 square miles (810 km^{2}) is land and 2.1 square miles (5.4 km^{2}) (0.7%) is water. The Tallapoosa River originates in Paulding County.

Paulding county is located in the Piedmont region of the Appalachian Mountains, with a few small hills and mountains located in the county that exceed elevations of 1,000 ft. The highest point in Paulding county is an unnamed peak located in Yorkville with an elevation of 1,410 ft (430 m) above sea level. The highest named peak in Paulding County is Vinson Mountain, with an elevation of 1,330 ft (405 m) above sea level.

The southeastern portion of Paulding County, from just north of Hiram to north of Villa Rica, is located in the Middle Chattahoochee River-Lake Harding sub-basin of the ACF River Basin (Apalachicola-Chattahoochee-Flint River Basin). The very western portion of the county, centered on State Route 101, is located in the Upper Tallapoosa River sub-basin of the ACT River Basin (Coosa-Tallapoosa River Basin), with the majority of the central and northern portions of Paulding County located in the Etowah River sub-basin of the same ACT River Basin.

=== Adjacent counties ===
- Bartow County – north
- Cobb County – east
- Douglas County – southeast
- Carroll County – south
- Haralson County – southwest
- Polk County – west

== Transportation ==
=== Major highways ===
- U.S. Route 278 / State Route 6
  - State Route 6 Business
- State Route 61
- State Route 92
- State Route 101
- State Route 113
- State Route 120
  - State Route 120 Connector
- State Route 360
- State Route 381 (former)

=== Secondary highways ===
- Dallas-Acworth Highway (Old S.R. 381)
- Ridge Road (Old S.R. 61 Connector). Connector in South Paulding that runs between SR 92 and SR 61.
- East Paulding Drive (Old S.R. 120 Connector, S.R. 92 Connector and S.R. 176). Road formerly known as Dragstrip Road
- Goldmine Road (Old U.S. 278/S.R. 6). Former route to Yorkville.
- Bill Carruth Parkway, formerly known as West Hiram Parkway, originally known as Egg Farm Road
- Bobo Road (Old S.R. 92)
- Macland Road (Old S.R. 360). All of Macland Road west of S.R. 120.
- Mulberry Rock Road
- Braswell Mountain Road
- Cedarcrest Road
- Seven Hills Boulevard
- Harmony Grove Church Road
- Dabbs Bridge Road
- Vinson Mountain Road
- Brushy Mountain Road
- Nebo Road
- Davis Mill Road N
- Mount Olivet Road

=== Pedestrians and cycling ===
- Dallas Trail Connect
- Graves Path
- Lindsey Path
- Silver Comet Trail

== Demographics ==
Historical population
Census	Pop.	Note	%±
1840	2,556		—
1850	7,039		175.4%
1860	7,038		0.0%
1870	7,639		8.5%
1880	10,887		42.5%
1890	11,948		9.7%
1900	12,969		8.5%
1910	14,124		8.9%
1920	14,025		−0.7%
1930	12,327		−12.1%
1940	12,832		4.1%
1950	11,752		−8.4%
1960	13,101		11.5%
1970	17,520		33.7%
1980	26,110		49.0%
1990	41,611		59.4%
2000	81,678		96.3%
2010	142,324		74.3%
2020	168,661		18.5%
2025 (est.)	190,996	▲	13.2%
U.S. Decennial Census; 1790-1880 1890-1910; 1920-1930 1930-1940; 1940-1950 1960-1980; 1980-2000 2010 2020

=== Racial and ethnic composition ===
Paulding County, Georgia – racial and ethnic composition Note: the US Census treats Hispanic/Latino as an ethnic category. This table excludes Latinos from the racial categories and assigns them to a separate category. Hispanics/Latinos may be of any race.
Race / ethnicity (NH = Non-Hispanic)	Pop 1980	Pop 1990	Pop 2000	Pop 2010	Pop 2020	% 1980	% 1990	% 2000	% 2010	% 2020
White alone (NH)	24,707	39,515	73,188	106,739	108,444	94.63%	94.96%	89.61%	75.00%	64.30%
Black or African American alone (NH)	1,198	1,642	5,634	23,810	36,609	4.59%	3.95%	6.90%	16.73%	21.71%
Native American or Alaska Native alone (NH)	28	109	212	353	394	0.11%	0.26%	0.26%	0.25%	0.23%
Asian alone (NH)	21	73	324	1,237	1,926	0.08%	0.18%	0.40%	0.87%	1.14%
Native Hawaiian or Pacific Islander alone (NH)	x	x	22	58	114	x	x	0.03%	0.04%	0.07%
Other race alone (NH)	12	3	84	280	1,068	0.05%	0.01%	0.10%	0.20%	0.63%
Mixed-race or multiracial (NH)	x	x	816	2,583	7,542	x	x	1.00%	1.81%	4.47%
Hispanic or Latino (any race)	144	269	1,398	7,264	12,564	0.55%	0.65%	1.71%	5.10%	7.45%
Total	26,110	41,611	81,678	142,324	168,661	100.00%	100.00%	100.00%	100.00%	100.00%

=== 2020 census ===
As of the 2020 census, there were 168,661 people, 56,911 households, and 44,021 families residing in the county.

The median age was 36.4 years. 26.5% of residents were under the age of 18 and 11.5% of residents were 65 years of age or older. For every 100 females there were 94.0 males, and for every 100 females age 18 and over there were 90.8 males age 18 and over.

79.5% of residents lived in urban areas, while 20.5% lived in rural areas.

The racial makeup of the county was 65.9% White, 22.1% Black or African American, 0.4% American Indian and Alaska Native, 1.2% Asian, 0.1% Native Hawaiian and Pacific Islander, 3.0% from some other race, and 7.3% from two or more races. Hispanic or Latino residents of any race comprised 7.4% of the population.

There were 56,911 households in the county, of which 41.6% had children under the age of 18 living with them and 23.1% had a female householder with no spouse or partner present. About 17.0% of all households were made up of individuals and 6.7% had someone living alone who was 65 years of age or older.

There were 59,172 housing units, of which 3.8% were vacant. Among occupied housing units, 78.8% were owner-occupied and 21.2% were renter-occupied. The homeowner vacancy rate was 1.7% and the rental vacancy rate was 4.8%.

=== 2010 census ===
As of the 2010 United States census, there were 142,324 people, 48,105 households, and 38,103 families living in the county. The population density was 455.8 inhabitants per square mile (176.0/km^{2}). There were 52,130 housing units at an average density of 167.0 per square mile (64.5/km^{2}). The racial makeup of the county was 77.7% white, 17.1% black or African American, 0.9% Asian, 0.3% American Indian, 1.7% from other races, and 2.3% from two or more races. Those of Hispanic or Latino origin made up 5.1% of the population. In terms of ancestry, 14.7% were Irish, 11.6% were American, 11.2% were German, and 10.4% were English.

Of the 48,105 households, 47.7% had children under the age of 18 living with them, 61.5% were married couples living together, 12.8% had a female householder with no husband present, 20.8% were non-families, and 16.6% of all households were made up of individuals. The average household size was 2.94 and the average family size was 3.30. The median age was 33.8 years.

The median income for a household in the county was $62,348 and the median income for a family was $67,117. Males had a median income of $50,114 versus $37,680 for females. The per capita income for the county was $23,450. About 7.0% of families and 8.2% of the population were below the poverty line, including 9.4% of those under age 18 and 11.8% of those age 65 or over.

Paulding County has been noted for its rapid population growth in the 21st century, often ranking among the fastest-growing counties in Metro Atlanta and the state of Georgia. The rate of population growth increased in each of three consecutive years from 2015 to 2017.

=== 2000 census ===
As of the census of 2000, there were 81,678 people, 28,089 households, and 22,892 families living in the county. The population density was 261 inhabitants per square mile (101/km^{2}). There were 29,274 housing units at an average density of 93 per square mile (36/km^{2}). The racial makeup of the county was 90.59% White, 6.96% Black or African American, 0.30% Native American, 0.40% Asian, 0.03% Pacific Islander, 0.57% from other races, and 1.16% from two or more races. 1.71% of the population were Hispanic or Latino of any race.

There were 28,089 households, out of which 46.20% had children under the age of 18 living with them, 68.30% were married couples living together, 9.00% had a female householder with no husband present, and 18.50% were non-families. 14.60% of all households were made up of individuals, and 3.80% had someone living alone who was 65 years of age or older. The average household size was 2.89 and the average family size was 3.20.

In the county, 30.70% of the population was under the age of 18, 7.60% from 18 to 24, 38.40% from 25 to 44, 17.40% from 45 to 64, and 5.90% was 65 years of age or older. The median age was 31 years. For every 100 females, there were 100.20 males. For every 100 females age 18 and over, there were 96.80 males.

The median income for a household in the county was $52,161, and the median income for a family was $56,039. Males had a median income of $38,637 versus $27,341 for females. The per capita income for the county was $19,974. About 4.00% of families and 5.50% of the population were below the poverty line, including 5.60% of those under age 18 and 9.50% of those age 65 or over.

== Education ==
There is one school district: Paulding County School District.

High schools

- East Paulding High School
- Hiram High School
- Paulding County High School
- South Paulding High School
- North Paulding High School

== Media ==
The county legal organ is The Dallas New Era.

== Recreation ==
- Silver Comet Trail
- White Oak Park
- Ben Hill Strickland Park
- Taylor Farm Parks & Recreation
- Burnt Hickory Park
- Union Park/Mulberry Rock Park
- Samuel U. Braly Sports Complex
- Mt. Tabor Park
- Sara Babb Park (City of Dallas)
- Veteran's Memorial Park

== Communities ==
=== Cities ===
- Dallas (county seat)
- Hiram
- Braswell

=== Unincorporated communities ===
- New Hope
- Yorkville
- Nebo
- Sudie
- New Georgia
- Union
- Burnt Hickory

== 2022 police brutality incident ==
The full dash-cam footage of the incident

On March 4, 2022, at approximately 6:00 a.m., 25-year-old Deputy Michael M. McMaster of the Paulding County Sheriff’s Office responded to a report of a suspicious person, who was wearing a hoodie and a backpack, attempting to break into a vehicle in the Evans Mill Subdivision. A short time later, McMaster arrived at the location and observed 30-year-old Tyler Lee Canaris walking along the roadside at the entrance to the subdivision. Canaris, who was wearing a hoodie and a backpack, appeared to match the description of the suspect that was provided by dispatch. McMaster then approached Canaris, whom he claimed refused to comply with the deputy's commands to remove his backpack and place his hands behind his back.

McMaster used force to bring Canaris to the ground and placed him under arrest. Once arrested, Canaris was evaluated on the scene by medical personnel. He was then transported to the hospital by the sheriff's office for medical evaluation. Sheriff's officials say it was later determined that Canaris was not breaking into cars, but he was charged with obstruction of justice. Soon after, the attorneys for Canaris accused the deputy of leaving their client with $75,000 worth of medical bills from fractured bones and a ruptured eardrum. Prior to the incident, McMaster already had 10 reprimands, and was advised to undergo anger management counseling.

The Paulding County Sheriff's Office initially refused to release the dash-cam footage that captured the incident to the public. However, some of the footage was leaked by Canaris' lawyers in early 2023, which led to Canaris being charged with obstruction of iustice a second time. The sheriff's office released the full dash-cam footage a week later. On September 22, 2023, Canaris filed a lawsuit against McMaster and the sheriff's office. Due to the backlash the dash-cam video received online, McMaster was eventually fired from the Paulding County Sheriff's Office, and ended up on the Brady List as a result.

== Politics ==
Paulding County is governed by a five-member board of commissioners, including a chairman and four post members. In the Georgia State Legislature, Paulding County is represented by two state senators and four state representatives. For elections to the Georgia State Senate, Paulding County is divided between District 30 and District 31. For elections to the Georgia House of Representatives, Paulding County is divided between districts 16, 17, 18, and 19. For federal elections, it is located in Georgia's 14th congressional district, currently represented by Clay Fuller.

Paulding County has been a Republican stronghold since 1984, but in recent elections, the Republican strength has decreased. In 2024, even though Donald Trump still won over 60% of the vote, Kamala Harris' performance of 38% was the best by a Democrat since 1980.

United States presidential election results for Paulding County, Georgia
Year	Republican		Democratic		Third party(ies)	
Year	No.	%	No.	%	No.	%
1880	258	21.32%	952	78.68%	0	0.00%
1884	221	24.29%	689	75.71%	0	0.00%
1888	185	23.57%	592	75.41%	8	1.02%
1892	158	10.50%	641	42.59%	706	46.91%
1896	552	44.52%	627	50.56%	61	4.92%
1900	609	46.00%	496	37.46%	219	16.54%
1904	341	27.91%	402	32.90%	479	39.20%
1908	630	58.44%	256	23.75%	192	17.81%
1912	32	2.80%	426	37.30%	684	59.89%
1916	10	0.68%	670	45.80%	783	53.52%
1920	954	73.72%	340	26.28%	0	0.00%
1924	378	40.95%	419	45.40%	126	13.65%
1928	1,301	65.34%	690	34.66%	0	0.00%
1932	276	12.40%	1,914	85.98%	36	1.62%
1936	645	31.71%	1,386	68.14%	3	0.15%
1940	770	31.62%	1,653	67.89%	12	0.49%
1944	775	36.33%	1,355	63.53%	3	0.14%
1948	139	9.55%	981	67.38%	336	23.08%
1952	788	26.80%	2,152	73.20%	0	0.00%
1956	940	37.02%	1,599	62.98%	0	0.00%
1960	812	25.31%	2,396	74.69%	0	0.00%
1964	1,914	43.23%	2,513	56.77%	0	0.00%
1968	977	19.33%	1,023	20.24%	3,054	60.43%
1972	2,814	73.70%	1,004	26.30%	0	0.00%
1976	1,432	20.90%	5,420	79.10%	0	0.00%
1980	2,845	36.87%	4,686	60.72%	186	2.41%
1984	6,048	69.77%	2,621	30.23%	0	0.00%
1988	7,329	72.63%	2,717	26.92%	45	0.45%
1992	7,180	47.59%	5,212	34.54%	2,696	17.87%
1996	10,152	57.57%	5,699	32.32%	1,782	10.11%
2000	16,881	69.58%	6,743	27.79%	636	2.62%
2004	30,843	76.13%	9,420	23.25%	251	0.62%
2008	39,192	68.67%	17,229	30.19%	655	1.15%
2012	40,846	70.98%	15,825	27.50%	872	1.52%
2016	44,662	68.21%	18,025	27.53%	2,793	4.27%
2020	54,517	63.82%	29,695	34.76%	1,205	1.41%
2024	58,769	61.73%	35,802	37.61%	625	0.66%

United States Senate election results for Paulding County, Georgia2
Year	Republican		Democratic		Third party(ies)	
Year	No.	%	No.	%	No.	%
2020	53,485	63.26%	28,755	34.01%	2,308	2.73%
2020	46,872	63.38%	27,083	36.62%	0	0.00%

United States Senate election results for Paulding County, Georgia3
Year	Republican		Democratic		Third party(ies)	
Year	No.	%	No.	%	No.	%
2020	30,597	36.43%	19,118	22.76%	34,271	40.81%
2020	46,619	63.04%	27,335	36.96%	0	0.00%
2022	40,689	60.99%	24,389	36.56%	1,635	2.45%
2022	36,388	61.81%	22,485	38.19%	0	0.00%

Georgia Gubernatorial election results for Paulding County
Year	Republican		Democratic		Third party(ies)	
Year	No.	%	No.	%	No.	%
2022	43,992	65.66%	22,427	33.47%	585	0.87%

== Notable people ==
- Shannon and Shannade Clermont, models
- Jayne County, formerly known as Wayne County: influential transgender punk rock musician after leaving Paulding County for New York City in 1968
- Emory Gordy Jr., record producer, spouse of Patty Loveless
- Caleb Lee Hutchinson, American Idol finalist
- Patty Loveless, country musician, spouse of Emory Gordy Jr.
- Marty Pevey, Iowa Cubs manager
- Riley Puckett, country music pioneer
- Spencer Scott, Playboy Playmate of the Month for October 2007
- Ray Traylor, former WWF professional wrestler
- Travis Tritt, country music recording artist
- Zack Wheeler, Philadelphia Phillies starting pitcher

== See also ==
- National Register of Historic Places listings in Paulding County, Georgia
- List of counties in Georgia
