= A Tourist's Guide to Love =

2023 film by Steven K. Tsuchida

- Official release poster
- Directed by: Steven K. Tsuchida
- Written by: Eirene Tran Donohue
- Produced by: Rachael Leigh Cook; Joel S. Rice
- Starring: Rachael Leigh Cook; Scott Ly; Missi Pyle; Ben Feldman
- Cinematography: Jon Keng
- Edited by: Lauren Connelly
- Music by: Jina Hyojin An; Shirley Song
- Production companies: Muse Entertainment; Head First; Ben's Sister Production
- Distributed by: Netflix
- Release date: April 21, 2023
- Running time: 96 minutes
- Country: United States
- Languages: English; Vietnamese

A Tourist's Guide to Love is a 2023 romantic comedy film directed by Steven K. Tsuchida and written by Eirene Tran Donohue. It stars Rachael Leigh Cook, Scott Ly, Missi Pyle, Ben Feldman, Nondumiso Tembe and Andrew Barth Feldman (in his feature film acting debut).

Travel industry executive Amanda Riley takes an undercover work assignment abroad in Vietnam, shortly after going through an unexpected breakup, finding love where she least expected.

Filming took place on location in Vietnam in April 2022. The film was released by Netflix to mixed reviews on April 21, 2023.

== Plot ==
Amanda Riley, a travel industry professional for Tourista, undertakes a covert mission to study Vietnam's tourism sector. This is after her five-year relationship with John ends unexpectedly. Her boss Mona had convinces her to get a manicure for an expected proposal, however he instead suggests a hiatus to take a position in Ohio.

Amanda is met at the Vietnamese airport by Sinh, the tour guide for Saigon Silver Star, and his cousin Anh, the owner's daughter. In the evening, Amanda meets the rest of the group. To maintain her cover, she proposes that they keep their professions secrets as a game.

Mona gives Amanda proposed itineraries, which Sinh consistently rejects and insists that she trust his choices. She starts to leave her comfort zone through bartering, tasting exotic foods and learning to cross a busy street without a crosswalk. Sinh sees that Amanda sells herself short and believes that instead of trying to follow a rigorous itinerary, they should be flexible and see where the day takes them.

At a temple, Sinh pulls some strings so their group can watch preparation for the lion dance for the Vietnamese Lunar New Year celebration Tết. At a seamstress store, the group gets clothes tailor made. This is a Tết custom, to wear something new with bright colors to invite luck and prosperity.

As the others rest before dinner, Sinh takes Amanda to a tiny street decorated with bright paper lanterns. There he opens up, explaining he moved to the U.S. as a child but returned after college. Sinh first worked at his father's restaurant, but found his calling as a tour guide at his uncle's company.

Enjoying the day by the water, Sinh and Amanda ride a round boat and fall into the water. Soon afterwards, Anh discovers that getting tickets for the Golden Bridge will take hours, so Sinh again improvises. They go to the My Son Sanctuary, a set of Hindu ruins built over a thousand years ago.

A growingly inspired Amanda follows Sinh off the beaten path as the group visits his grandmother's village. There, they stay at the homes of locals. His grandma, sensing chemistry between him and Amanda, invites her to stay at hers. The group helps prepare for Tết by cleaning, decorating and preparing a feast.

Anh interprets for their grandmother, so that she can ask Amanda what her intentions are with Sinh. Although she is obviously interested in him, she insists she just wants to stay friends. The grandmother says she does not believe her and leaves. Anh stays, confiding in Amanda that her dad is selling the company, something Sinh is unaware of.

Anh also tells Amanda that whoever first knocks on your door on Tết greatly influences your coming year. Sinh happens to visit her bright and early in the morning and everyone helps with the feast. Wearing their custom-made outfits, both old and new bonds are made stronger. Amanda is about to tell Sinh about her purpose for the trip but they kiss instead.

Arriving in Hanoi the next day, John surprises them, saying he wants to win Amanda back. Both Sinh and Amanda look crestfallen. Alone together, John tells her he is ready to advance their relationship. Amanda calls Mona to tell her of her unintentional love triangle with the comfortable John and the adventurous and exciting Sinh.

At that evening's water puppetry show, Sinh sullenly sits on one side of Amanda while John sits on the other. As the group sits outside chatting happily about the show while having street vendor food, Anh hears that Tourista has bought the tour company. John unthinkingly congratulates Amanda, forcing her to confess her involvement. An upset Sinh storms off and she follows him, but he believes it was all a lie.

The next day, John tells Amanda that he will return to Los Angeles at the end of the year, so they can house hunt then. She realizes he is not motivated to marry her but just wants to please her. Amanda says she no longer wants this anymore and says goodbye to John.

Meanwhile, the cousins make up and Sinh decides to go to his father's house to clear his head. When Amanda finds out, Anh helps her cross the city to stop Sinh from leaving and confess her feelings. Once they reconnect, they embrace.

== Cast ==
- Rachael Leigh Cook as Amanda Riley
- Scott Ly as Sinh Thach
- Ben Feldman as John
- Missi Pyle as Mona
- Glynn Sweet as Brian Conway
- Alexa Povah as Maya Conway
- Jacqueline Correa as Sam Gonville
- Nondumiso Tembe as Dom Fisher
- Morgan Dudley as Robin
- Andrew Barth Feldman as Alex
- Quinn Trúc Trần as Anh
- Lê Thiện as Ba Noi
- Anh Dào as Auntie Diem

== Production ==
In April 2021, Variety reported that Rachael Leigh Cook would star in and produce a romantic comedy, A Tourist's Guide to Love, that is based on an original idea of hers, with Eirene Tran Donohue writing the screenplay. The film is a Netflix Original film produced by Head First Productions and Muse Entertainment. In May 2022, the casting of Scott Ly, Ben Feldman, Missi Pyle, Jacqueline Correa, Nondumiso Tembe, Morgan Lynee Dudley, Andrew Barth Feldman, Glynn Sweet, Alexa Povah, Thanh Truc and Le Thien was announced.

Principal photography commenced in April 2022, and took place on location in various cities of Vietnam, such as Ho Chi Minh City, Da Nang, Hội An, Hanoi and Hà Giang. Donohue explained why it was important to her not to have an American film set in the country that focused on war, saying "There are almost no American movies set in Vietnam that aren't about the trauma of war. It was really important to me to tell a story about life now. One that was full of joy and love and celebration. I wanted to change the conversation about Vietnam, to highlight it as a modern thriving country whose stories are worthy of being told".

== Release and reception ==
A Tourist's Guide to Love was released by Netflix on April 21, 2023.

On the review aggregator website Rotten Tomatoes, 72% of 18 critics' reviews are positive, with an average rating of 5.8/10. Metacritic, which uses a weighted average, assigned the film a score of 49 out of 100, based on 8 critics, indicating "mixed or average" reviews.

Christy Lemire of RogerEbert.com gave the film a score of two and a half out of five, commenting that the film simply satisfied all of the genre's clichés. Despite her praise of Cook's "likability" and Ly's charisma and "understated delivery", she concluded that the story was simply "as harmless as its blandly forgettable title would suggest". Variety's Courtney Howard was more effusive about both Cook and Ly's "sparkling repartee" and complemented their chemistry together. She praised the "care to incorporate the sights and sounds of Vietnam into the narrative", but she conceded that the film hinges on "the safety of genre tropes" and criticized the filmmakers for not going "off-book" and taking "a less travelled path" to enhance the narrative.

The Los Angeles Times's Noel Murray was likewise critical of the plot and deemed that though "the movie's leads are undeniably charming, director Steven K. Tsuchida and screenwriter Eirene Tran Donohue don't give them much to do that hasn't been done many times before." Elisabeth Vincentelli writing for The New York Times, also panned the film for its lack of originality and found that the "soundtrack's catchy Vietnamese songs provide the only fizz in this otherwise flat concoction."
