= Paulding County School District =

School district in Georgia (U.S. state)

Address
- 3236 Atlanta Highway Dallas, Georgia, 30132; United States
- Coordinates: 33.90926°N 84.78825°W

District information
- Grades: Pre-kindergarten – 12
- Established: 1872
- Superintendent: Steve Barnette
- Accreditations: Southern Association of Colleges and Schools; Georgia Accrediting Commission
- NCES District ID: 1304020

Students and staff
- Enrollment: 31,518 (2022–23)
- Faculty: 2,100.00 (FTE)
- Staff: 1,844.50 (FTE)
- Student–teacher ratio: 15.01

Other information
- Telephone: (770) 443-8000
- Fax: (770) 443-8089
- Website: paulding.k12.ga.us

The Paulding County School District is a public school district in Paulding County, Georgia, United States, based in Dallas.

Its boundaries parallel that of the county. It serves the communities of Braswell, Dallas, and Hiram.

== Schools ==
The Paulding County school district is composed of thirty-four schools as of 2024–25: twenty-one elementary schools, ten middle schools, and five high schools.

After the 2011–12 school year, P.B. Ritch Elementary closed and a new middle school with the same name opened near Hiram the following year. In 2017, the school district re-opened the old P.B. Ritch Elementary School facility as the Dianne Wright Innovation Center. The Dianne Wright Innovation Center houses offices for Student Assessment, Professional Learning, School Nutrition, and the Cobb/Paulding Adult Education Center which is operated by the Cobb County School District.

=== Elementary schools ===
- Abney Elementary School
- Allgood Elementary School
- Baggett Elementary School
- Burnt Hickory Elementary School
- Dallas Elementary School
- Dugan Elementary School
- Hiram Elementary School
- Hutchens Elementary School
- McGarity Elementary School
- Nebo Elementary School
- New Georgia Elementary School
- Northside Elementary School
- Panter Elementary School
- Poole Elementary School
- Ragsdale Elementary School
- Roberts Elementary School
- Russom Elementary School
- Shelton Elementary School
- Union Elementary School

=== Middle schools ===
- Austin Middle School
- Dobbins Middle School
- East Paulding Middle School
- Herschel Jones Middle School
- Scoggins Middle School
- Moses Middle School
- South Paulding Middle School
- P.B. Ritch Middle School
- Sammy McClure Middle School
- Crossroads Middle School

=== High schools ===
- East Paulding High School
- Hiram High School
- Paulding County High School
- South Paulding High School
- North Paulding High School

== Parent involvement ==
Every school in Paulding County has a Parent Teacher Association or a Parent Teacher Student Association. These associations allow teachers, students, and parents to hold conferences to discuss the means of ensuring that the student achieves his or her goals. PTA and PTSA meetings are held either before or after school.

== Face Masks ==
The Paulding County School District gained national news coverage after images surfaced showing hundreds of students not wearing face masks. The school district had strongly encouraged staff and students to wear a face mask but did not require it. A student at North Paulding High School took the now viral pictures, and was initially suspended. The suspension was later revoked. 3 staff and 6 students later tested positive.
