= Nondumiso Tembe =

South African actress and singer

- Born: Nondumiso Tembe; 15 October 1987 (age 38); Durban, South Africa
- Education: American Musical and Dramatic Academy; The New School; Alvin Ailey American Dance Theater; British American Drama Academy; David Geffen School of Drama at Yale University
- Occupations: Actress, Singer, Songwriter, Dancer, Writer
- Years active: 1996–present
- Height: 1.63 m (5 ft 4 in)
- Parents: Bongani Tembe (father); Linda Bukhosini (mother)
- Relatives: Anele “Nelli” Tembe (sister)
- Website: http://www.nondumisotembe.com

Nondumiso Tembe (born 15 December 1987) is a South African actress, singer, songwriter, dancer and writer. She is best known for the roles in many Hollywood television serials such as; NCIS: Los Angeles, True Blood, Castle and Six.

== Personal life ==
Tembe was born on 15 December 1987 in Durban, South Africa. Her mother is Linda Bukhosini and father is Bongani Tembe, both opera singers. As a child, she left South Africa for the United States, returning at the age of 10 following the end of apartheid. She studied musical theatre at the American Musical and Dramatic Academy (AMDA). Then she graduated from the New York New School University with a bachelor's degree in Fine Arts in Theatre and later completed her master's degree in Political Science.

== Career ==
Tembe started to act in opera and theater in New York when she was 6 years old. Upon her return to South Africa, she played the titular role in the stage play Annie. The play became very popular and became the turning point of her career. With that play, she also became the first black actress to lead a multi-racial cast in a major theatrical production in post-Apartheid South Africa. Then she played the role of "Maria" in the play Leopard Skin and the role of "Thobile" in the play Mata-Mata. At the Los Angeles theatre, she performed in the play Romeo and Juliet with the role "Josephine Baker". In 2011, she made her television debut with a recurring role as a "ghost Mavis" on the serial True Blood.

In December 2013, she joined with the cast of popular soap opera, Generations with the role of "Phumelele Miya". In 2015, she made a supportive role in the Hollywood blockbuster Avengers: Age of Ultron. She was awarded the Best Lead Actress at the Musical Mercury Theatre Awards for her role in the musical Cinderella created by Rodgers and Hammerstein. She also won the Best Actress in the Supporting Role category during the Naledi Theatre Awards for her role, "Susan" in David Mamet’s play.

As a singer, she made her debut album titled IZWI LAMI; My Voice, which was released in January 2011. She participated in the 90th birthday celebration of Nelson Mandela in his residence in Qunu as a featured performer.

== Filmography ==
=== Film ===
| Year | Title | Role | Notes |
|---|---|---|---|
| 2015 | Avengers: Age of Ultron | Johannesburg Driver | |
| 2017 | Zulu Wedding | Lu Sabata | |
| 2017 | Michael Jackson: Searching for Neverland | Grace Rwaramba | TV movie |
| 2022 | Thoughts Are Things | Rochelle Turner | Short |
| 2023 | A Tourist's Guide to Love | Dom Fisher | |

=== Television ===
| Year | Title | Role | Notes |
|---|---|---|---|
| 2010 | NCIS: Los Angeles | Linda Pierce | Episode: "Hunted" |
| 2011 | True Blood | Mavis | Recurring cast: Season 4 |
| 2012 | NCIS | Petty Officer First Class Josie Sparks | Episode: "Lost at Sea" |
| 2013-14 | Generations | Phumelele Miya | Regular Cast |
| 2015 | The Book of Negroes | Fanta | Episode: "Episode #1.1" |
| 2016 | Castle | Aida N'diaye | Episode: "And Justice for All" |
| 2017 | Six | Na'omi Ajimuda | Recurring cast |

=== Video games ===
| Year | Title | Role | Notes |
|---|---|---|---|
| 2018 | World of Warcraft: Battle for Azeroth | (Voice) | |
| 2021 | Hearthstone | (Voice) | Cariel Roame |
