= South Paulding High School =

Public high school in Paulding County, Georgia, United States

Location
- 1364 Winn Road; Douglasville, Georgia; United States; 33.78558°N 84.83342°W

Information
- Type: Public high school
- Established: 2006
- School district: Paulding County School District
- Principal: Edward Thomas
- Faculty: 104.50 (FTE)
- Grades: 9–12
- Enrollment: 1,905 (2023–2024)
- Student to teacher ratio: 18.23
- Colors: Crimson and Gold
- Mascot: Spartan
- Website: https://sphs.paulding.k12.ga.us/

South Paulding High School is a public high school located in Paulding County, Georgia, United States. Opened in 2006, South Paulding is a part of the Paulding County School District. Beginning its second year (2007–2008), a 12th grade class was added and the student body was composed of 1657 students.

== Demographics ==
The student body of South Paulding is 57 percent Caucasian, 26.7 percent African American, 10.6 percent Hispanic, 0.4 percent Asian, and 5.3 percent other races.

== Athletics ==
South Paulding offers basketball, football, softball, volleyball, wrestling, cheerleading, cross-country, baseball, soccer, tennis, dance, esports, golf, and track and field. They compete in region 5 of the GHSA AAAAAA.

== Notable alumni ==
- Michael Carter II - NFL defensive back, New York Jets
- Caleb Lee Hutchinson - American Idol runner up
- Jamarion Wilcox - College football running back for the Kentucky Wildcats
