= Chattahoochee Technical College =

Technical college in Georgia, U.S.

- Other name: Chattahoochee Tech
- Type: Public community college
- Established: 1963
- Parent institution: Technical College System of Georgia
- President: Heather Pence
- Students: 11,156 (fall 2024)
- Location: Cobb County, Georgia, U.S.
- Website: chattahoocheetech.edu

Chattahoochee Technical College (Chattahoochee Tech, CTC, or Chatt Tech) is a public technical college in the U.S. state of Georgia. It is governed by the Technical College System of Georgia and has eight campuses in the north-northwest metro-Atlanta area, and another just outside the region. It is accredited by the Southern Association of Colleges and Schools Commission on Colleges (SACS) to award technical certificates of credit, diplomas, and associate degrees. The college was formed in 2009 as the result of the merger of Appalachian Technical College, Chattahoochee Technical College, and North Metro Technical College.

== Locations ==
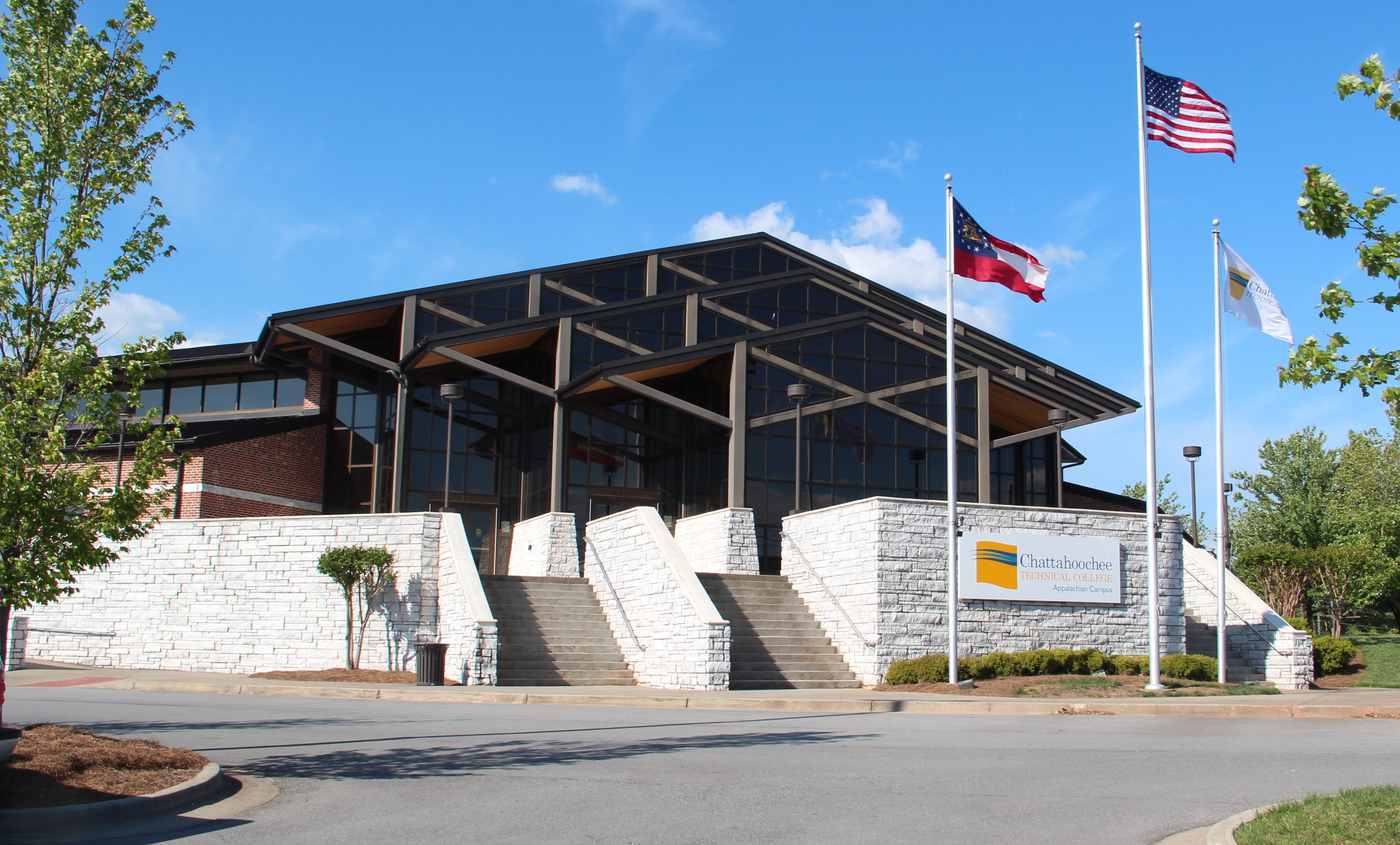
Chattahoochee Technical College's Appalachian Campus in Jasper

There are nine campuses locations north and northwest of Atlanta.

=== North Metro Campus ===
North Metro Technical College was established in 1989 as one of the first institutions created under the direction of the new Department of Technical and Adult Education. Originally named North Metro Technical Institute, the college was in Acworth, GA, and officially served Bartow and north Cobb counties, but was also positioned to serve the populations in Cherokee and Paulding counties. The campus was named the North Metro Campus following the 2009 merger.

=== Marietta Campus ===
The original and main campus, the Marietta Campus, is immediately adjacent to Marietta, between South Cobb Drive (Georgia 280) and Sandtown Road (33.929°N 84.555°W). During the early 2000s, three buildings were added on the other side of Sandtown Road, within the Marietta city limits.

=== Mountain View Campus ===
The Mountain View Campus is in northeast Cobb County (34.0343°N 84.4677°W); it is one of the college's three original campuses. The campus was donated to Cobb County by the family of Frank Gordy, proprietor of The Varsity restaurant in Atlanta. Specified for educational use, the county supplied the land and most of the construction money for the building, which was dedicated to the county commission in 2000 and opened for class that October, and was transferred to the state in 2009 after having been leased for a dollar a year. It shares a parking lot with the adjacent Mountain View Aquatics Center, an indoor public swimming pool run by the county. The school's address is on Frank Gordy Parkway, a loop which allows access to these developments, but whose street name signs all indicate only Gordy Parkway. The Mountain View Campus is home to the college's Design and Media Production Technology program, and the Film and Video Production Technology program.

=== Austell Campus ===
The South Cobb Campus is now known as the Austell Campus, (Mableton/Austell; 33.8156°N 84.6°W); it is one of the college's three original campuses. The South Cobb Campus was renamed the Austell Campus in spring 2010. It consists of two one-story buildings on Tech Center Drive, and its address is on Veterans Memorial Drive (U.S. 78/278 & Georgia 8), which was originally the historic Bankhead Highway.

=== Paulding Campus ===
The Paulding Campus (Dallas; 33.9107°N 84.8263°W) is another of the college's three original campuses. It was dedicated in November 1996. A second building was constructed in 2009, and dedicated on October 13, with keynote speaker Glenn Richardson. The Paulding Campus is home to the college's nursing program.

=== Appalachian Campus ===
Gilmer (north of Pickens) is the only county within the school's official service area that does not have a campus of its own, but is served by the Appalachian Campus in Jasper, Pickens County.

=== Canton Campus ===
The Canton Campus opened at Bluffs Technology Park (approximately 34.2735°N 84.4707°W) for winter quarter 2011.

=== Woodstock Campus ===
The Woodstock Campus is in the former Woodstock Elementary School (historically the all-grades Woodstock School, the town's first public school), and was the second campus of Appalachian Tech.

=== Aviation Training Academy ===
The Aviation Training Academy is a specialized aviation education facility operated by Chattahoochee Technical College. The academy is located near Paulding Northwest Atlanta Airport in Paulding County and provides workforce training programs focused on aviation maintenance, avionics, and related technical fields. In 2025, Chattahoochee Technical College received an FAA Air Agency Certificate, authorizing the Aviation Training Academy to operate as an FAA-approved Aviation Maintenance Technician School (AMTS). This approval allows students to pursue Airframe and Powerplant (A&P) certification through the academy.

== Notable alumni ==
- Monica Helms, American transgender activist and author
