= North Paulding High School =

Public high school in Dallas, Georgia

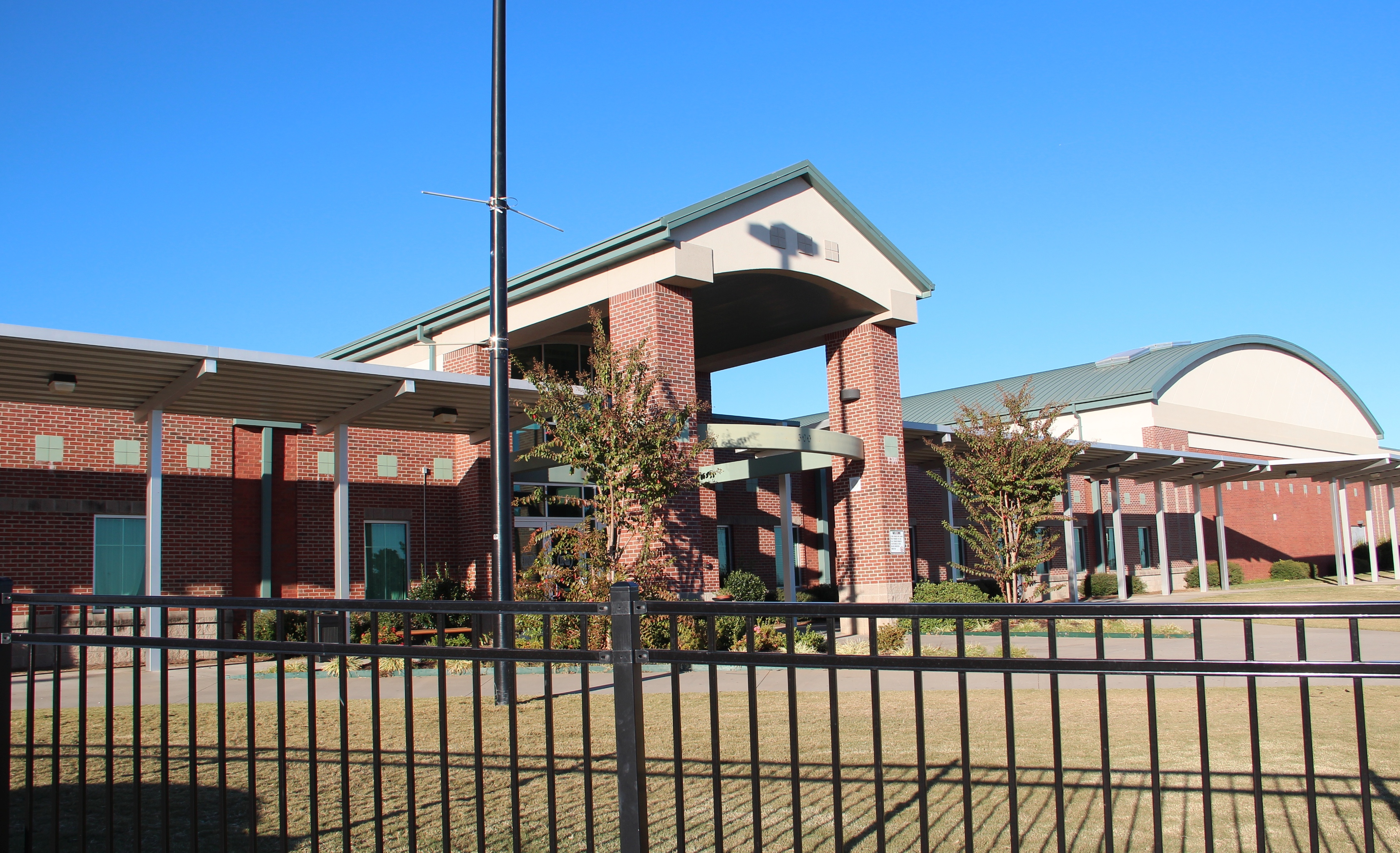
- North Paulding High School in 2016

Location
- 300 North Paulding Drive; Dallas, Georgia, 30132; United States; 34.0736°N 84.8067°W

Information
- Type: Public high school
- Established: 2007
- School district: Paulding County
- Principal: Gabe Carmona
- Staff: 162.10 (FTE)
- Grades: 9 to 12
- Enrollment: 3,015 (2024-2025)
- Student to teacher ratio: 18.60
- Colors: Navy and silver
- Athletics: GHSA
- Athletics conference: 7A - Region 5
- Team name: Wolfpack
- Website: nphs.paulding.k12.ga.us

North Paulding High School is a public high school in Dallas, Georgia, United States. Established in 2007, the school is managed by the Paulding County School District and has approximately 3,000 students enrolled. It received widespread attention during the COVID-19 pandemic for not mandating masks for its staff and students.

== Competitions ==
North Paulding competes in GHSA Class 7A, Region 5, for the 2026-2027 school year.

On November 15, 2025, the varsity competition cheerleading team won the Class 6A state championship. On March 14, 2026, the girls basketball team defeated Grayson 64-58 to secure the school's first basketball state championship.

== COVID-19 ==
In 2020, during the COVID-19 pandemic, photographs circulated showing crowded hallways at North Paulding High School, where masks were not mandatory. Two students were suspended for sharing photos of conditions within the school, though the suspensions of both were later rescinded. Just a few days after the photos were shared, six students and three staff members tested positive for COVID-19. Following these cases, the school temporarily transitioned to remote instruction. The district then introduced a hybrid-style schedule, combining in-person and virtual learning, to help reduce crowding. Students also had the option for fully online instruction.

== Notable alumni ==
- Chris Conley – Former NFL wide receiver
