= Braswell, Georgia =

- City
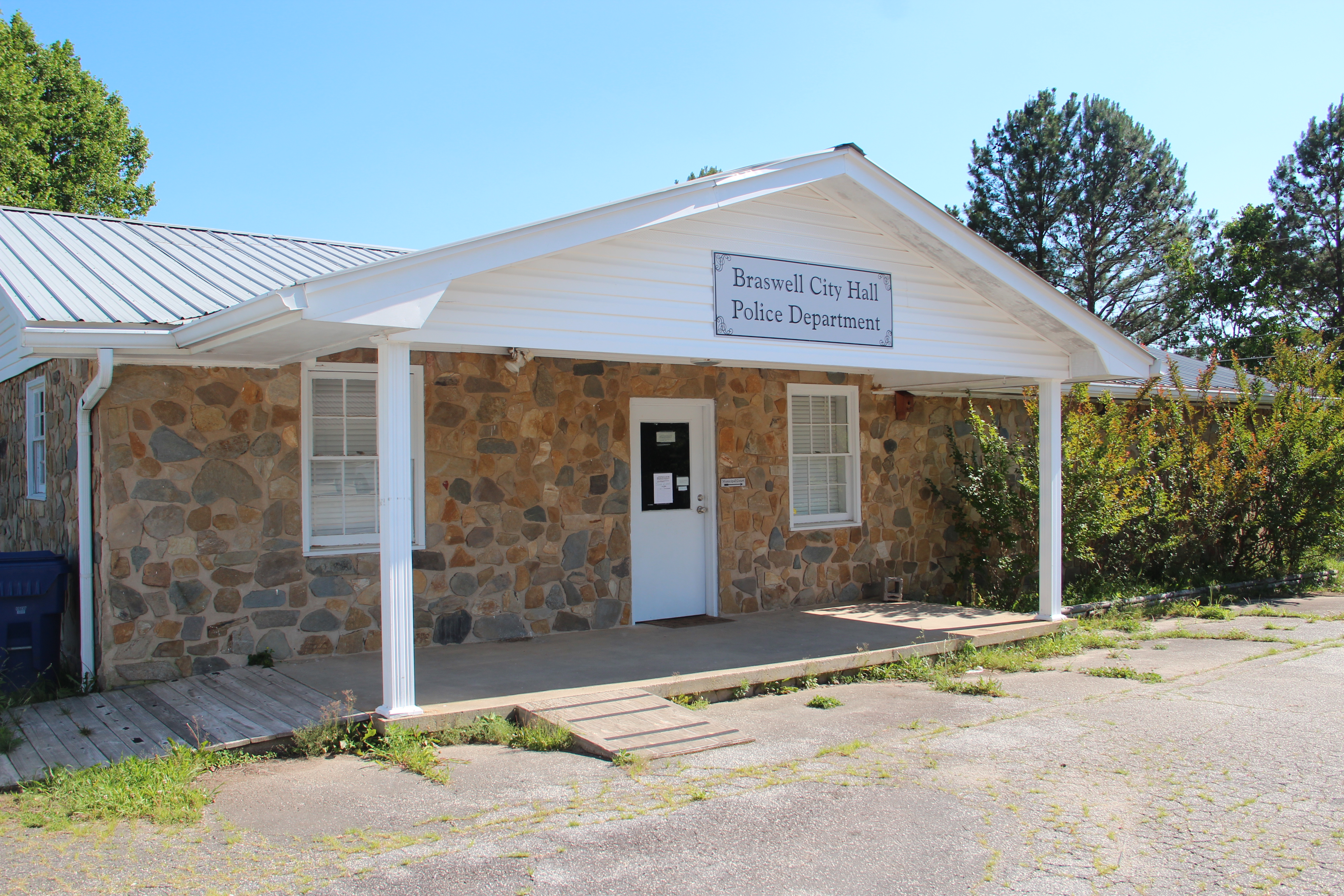
- City hall

- Seal

- Location in Paulding County and the state of Georgia
- Coordinates: 33°59′2″N 84°57′34″W
- Country: United States
- State: Georgia
- Counties: Polk, Paulding

Government
  - Mayor: Richard Fennell

Area
  - Total: 3.18 sq mi (8.23 km^{2})
  - Land: 3.17 sq mi (8.20 km^{2})
  - Water: 0.012 sq mi (0.03 km^{2})
- Elevation: 1,161 ft (354 m)

Population (2020)
  - Total: 355
  - Density: 112.2/sq mi (43.32/km^{2})
- Time zone: UTC-5 (Eastern (EST))
  - Summer (DST): UTC-4 (EDT)
- Area codes: 770/678/470
- FIPS code: 13-10104
- GNIS feature ID: 0331229
- Website: braswellga.org

Braswell is a city in Polk and Paulding counties in the U.S. state of Georgia. As of the 2020 census, the city had a population of 355.

== Geography ==
Braswell is located at 33°59′2″N 84°57′34″W (33.983787, -84.959479).

According to the United States Census Bureau, the city has a total area of 3.1 square miles (8.0 km^{2}), of which 3.1 square miles (8.0 km^{2}) is land and 0.33% is water.

== History ==
Braswell had its start in 1882 when Southern Railway predecessor East Tennessee Virginia & Georgia Railroad was extended to that point. The ETV&G became part of Southern Railway when Southern Railway was incorporated in 1894.

The city was named for Henry S. Braswell (1832–1902), a prominent citizen of Paulding County who owned a large amount of land in the area. Henry Braswell, in partnership with William McCracken, was in the land and timber business supplying crossties and bridge timbers to Southern Railway and Seaboard Air Line Railroad.

Braswell was the location of the only tunnel on Southern Railway's (now Norfolk Southern Railway) Chattanooga to Atlanta main line. The original tunnel was bypassed in 1979 by cutting through Braswell mountain slightly to the east.

Another nearby tunnel, the Brushy Mountain tunnel at Divide on the former route of the Seaboard Air Line Railroad, is currently used by bicyclists and joggers as a part of the Georgia/Alabama Silver Comet Trail. The portion of the trail in Alabama is the Chief Ladiga Trail, and the portion in Georgia is the Silver Comet Trail. This was named for one of the Seaboard Air Line passenger trains, the Silver Comet, that traveled the route.

== Demographics ==
Historical population
Census	Pop.	Note	%±
1900	100		—
1910	95		−5.0%
1920	58		−38.9%
1930	76		31.0%
1940	56		−26.3%
1950	25		−55.4%
1960	14		−44.0%
1970	30		114.3%
1980	282		840.0%
1990	247		−12.4%
2000	80		−67.6%
2010	379		373.8%
2020	355		−6.3%
U.S. Decennial Census

=== 2020 census ===
Braswell racial composition
Race	Num.	Perc.
White (non-Hispanic)	294	82.82%
Black or African American (non-Hispanic)	32	9.01%
Native American	1	0.28%
Asian	1	0.28%
Other/mixed	10	2.82%
Hispanic or Latino	17	4.79%

As of the 2020 United States census, there were 355 people, 131 households, and 89 families residing in the town.
