= Paulding County High School =

Public secondary school in Paulding County, Georgia, United States

Location
- 1297 Villa Rica Highway; Dallas, Georgia; United States; 33°53′33″N 84°50′00″W

Information
- Type: Public
- Established: 1969
- School district: Paulding County School District
- NCES School ID: 130402001471
- Faculty: 116.70 (on FTE basis)
- Grades: 9–12
- Enrollment: 2,116 (2023-2024)
- Student to teacher ratio: 18.13
- Colors: Red, white, and blue (and unofficially light gray)
- Mascot: Patriot
- Nickname: PC, Paulding
- Website: Paulding County High School

Paulding County High School is a public secondary school located in unincorporated Paulding County, Georgia, United States, outside of the Dallas city limits. A part of the Paulding County School District, the school was established in 1969 and is the oldest high school still in operation in Paulding County. It was established to help end segregation issues in the county.

== Location ==
Paulding County High School is located at 1297 Villa Rica Highway (Georgia State Route 61), about two miles south of downtown Dallas. It is one of only a few schools located on an old battlefield; it was built on the site of the Battle of Dallas in 1864 during the Atlanta campaign.

== Notable alumni ==
- Andy Ogide (2006), basketball player who plays overseas, 2016 Olympian
- Antonio Gandy-Golden (2016), former NFL wide receiver
- Dionté Ruffin (2017), professional football defensive back
- Ray Traylor, Jr. (1982), professional wrestler
- Smael Mondon Jr. (2021), linebacker for the Philadelphia Eagles
