= Hiram High School =

Public high school in Hiram, Georgia, United States

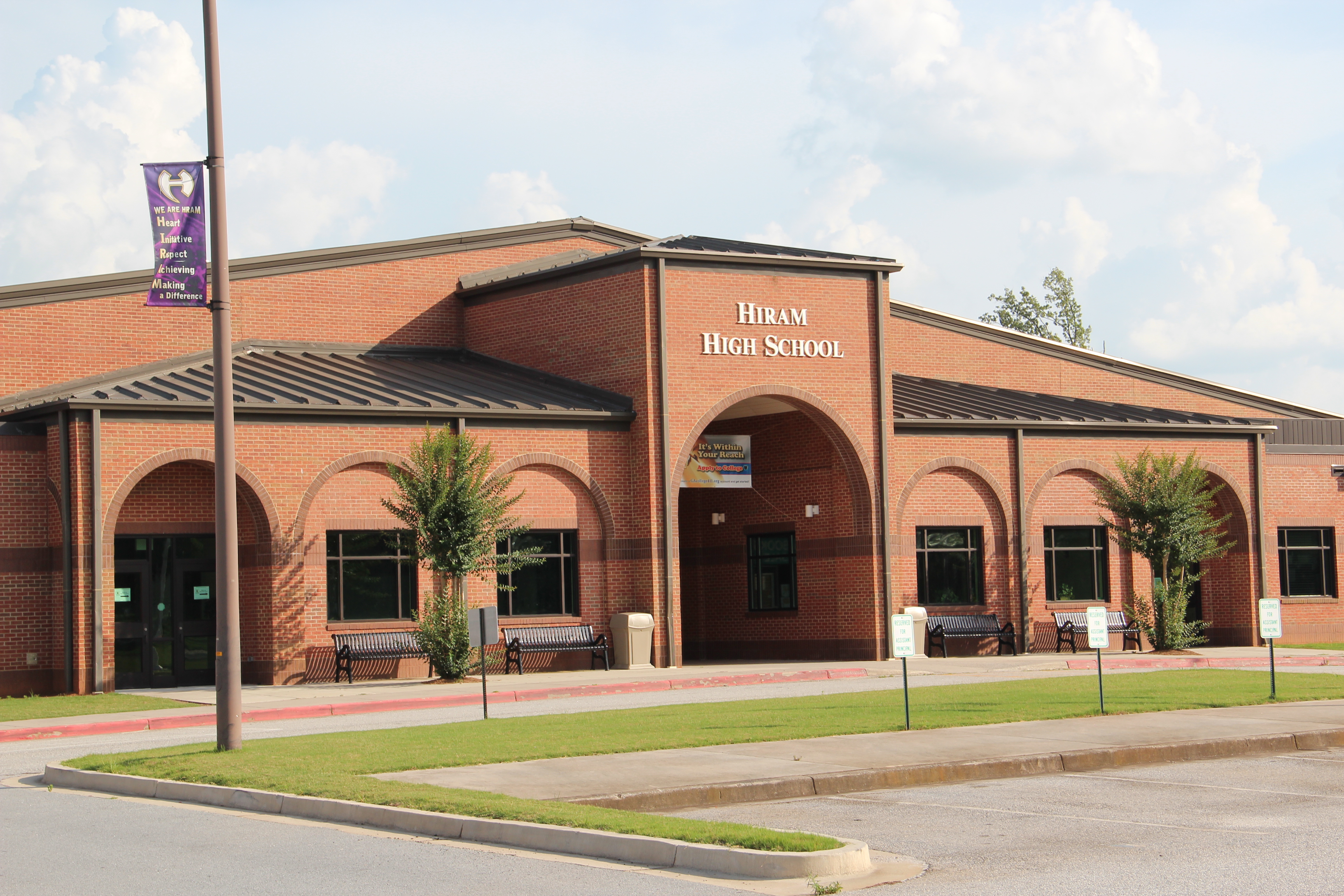

Location
- 702 Ballentine Drive; Hiram, Georgia 30141; United States; 33.87662°N 84.77061°W

Information
- Type: Public
- Established: 1999 (current campus)
- School district: Paulding County School District
- Principal: Misty Cooksey
- Teaching staff: 88.40 (FTE)
- Grades: 9 to 12
- Enrollment: 1,503 (2023–2024)
- Student to teacher ratio: 17.00
- Colors: Purple and gold
- Fight song: The Victors
- Team name: Hornets
- Website: School website

Hiram High School is a public high school in Hiram, Georgia, United States.

== History ==
The history of a school in the Hiram area goes back a century and a half. The first Hiram high School opened in 1850 as a one-room school house on Main Street. After the original building burned down, a second school was built on Powder Springs Street. The records list teachers working between 1907 and 1913, when a new three-room schoolhouse was built in Hiram. The school burned in 1922. Two years later, in 1924, a new school was built on the present location of Hiram Elementary School. In 1927, C. T. Norton became the principal and the school enrolled 177 pupils, the largest class so far. At that point Hiram was one of just 82 Georgia high schools which were accredited by the Southern Association of Colleges and Schools. In 1930 the nearby Vernon School was consolidated with Hiram and a steel-body bus was operated to bring the students from the Vernon community. The next year, in 1931, C. E. Landrum became the principal, and placed a previously missing importance on sports for the school.

Over the next 24 years, the old school was regularly expanded to account for increased population in the area. In 1955, an entirely new school was built and remained in operation until 1968. From 1938 to 1968, the school's enrollment expanded from 350 to 1000 students. In 1968, the Paulding County School District consolidated Hiram into Paulding County High School.

Hiram remained without a secondary school for 31 years. In the late 1990s, the present campus was built on a new site one mile to the west of downtown Hiram. The new Hiram High School first opened for the 1999–2000 school year. In the following years the school has seen numerous expansions and changes, such as many new sports fields, a new fine arts building, a secondary gymnasium, and a separate freshman building. In 2010, a large two-story facility that added 35 new classrooms to the school was completed on the previous site of the freshman building, allowing the large trailer classroom community (nicknamed "The Village" among students) to be removed. At present, Hiram has 1,763 enrolled students and graduates about 400 students each spring.

== Notable alumni ==
- Jonathan Greenard (Class of 2015): current outside linebacker for the Minnesota Vikings
- Trevard Lindley (Class of 2004): former cornerback for the Philadelphia Eagles
- Morgan Dudley (Class of 2019): Actress known for Descendants: The Rise of Red and Hadestown
