= Dallas, Georgia =

- City
- Seal Logo
- Motto: "A premier hometown"
- Location in Paulding County and the state of Georgia

- Location in Metro Atlanta
- Coordinates: 33°55′7″N 84°50′27″W
- Country: United States
- State: Georgia
- County: Paulding
- Town of Dallas: 1854
- City of Dallas: 1951

Government
  - Type: Mayor-council
  - Mayor: James Kelly
  - City manager: Kendall Smith

Area
  - Total: 7.42 sq mi (19.21 km^{2})
  - Land: 7.38 sq mi (19.12 km^{2})
  - Water: 0.035 sq mi (0.09 km^{2})
- Elevation: 1,043 ft (318 m)

Population (2020)
  - Total: 14,042
  - Density: 1,902.5/sq mi (734.55/km^{2})
- Time zone: UTC-5 (Eastern (EST))
  - Summer (DST): UTC-4 (EDT)
- ZIP Codes: 30132; 30157
- Area codes: 770; 678, 470, and 943
- FIPS code: 13-21324
- GNIS feature ID: 2404179
- Website: dallasga.gov

Dallas is a city in, and county seat of, Paulding County, Georgia, United States. The estimated population, as of 2020, was 14,042. Dallas is a northwestern exurb of Atlanta, located approximately 30 miles (48 km) from the downtown area. It was named for George M. Dallas, vice president of the United States, under James K. Polk.

== History ==
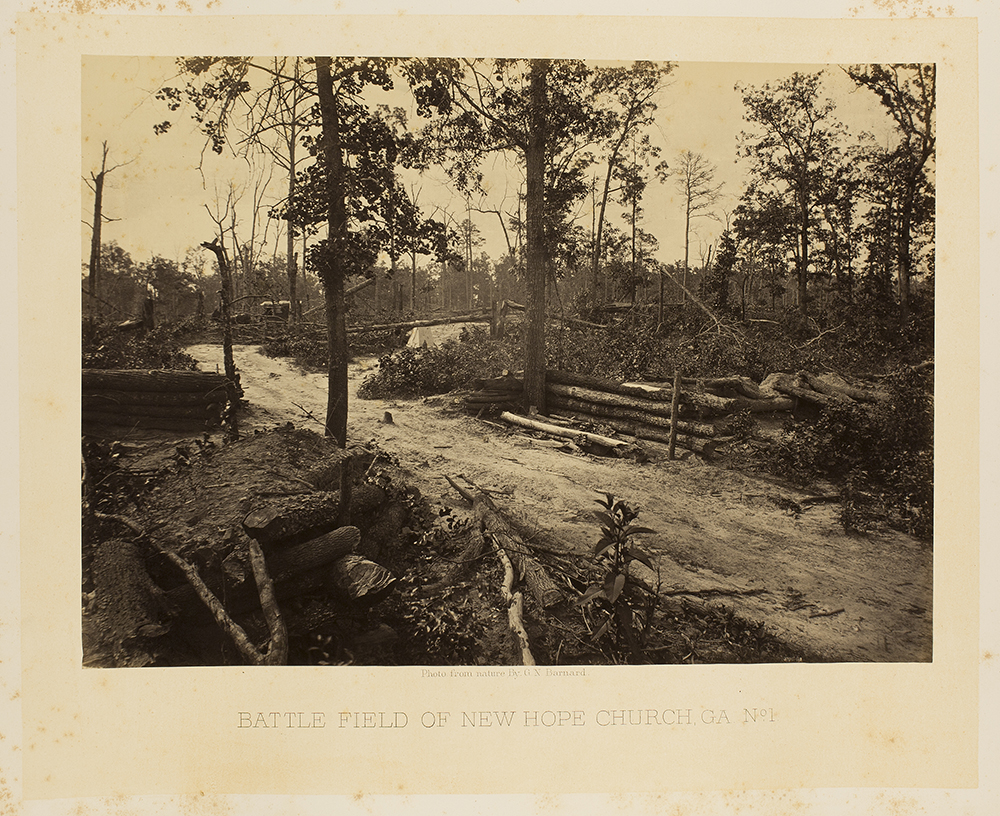
A picture, circa 1864–1866, of the "Hell Hole" after the Battle of New Hope Church, which was part of the Battle of Dallas

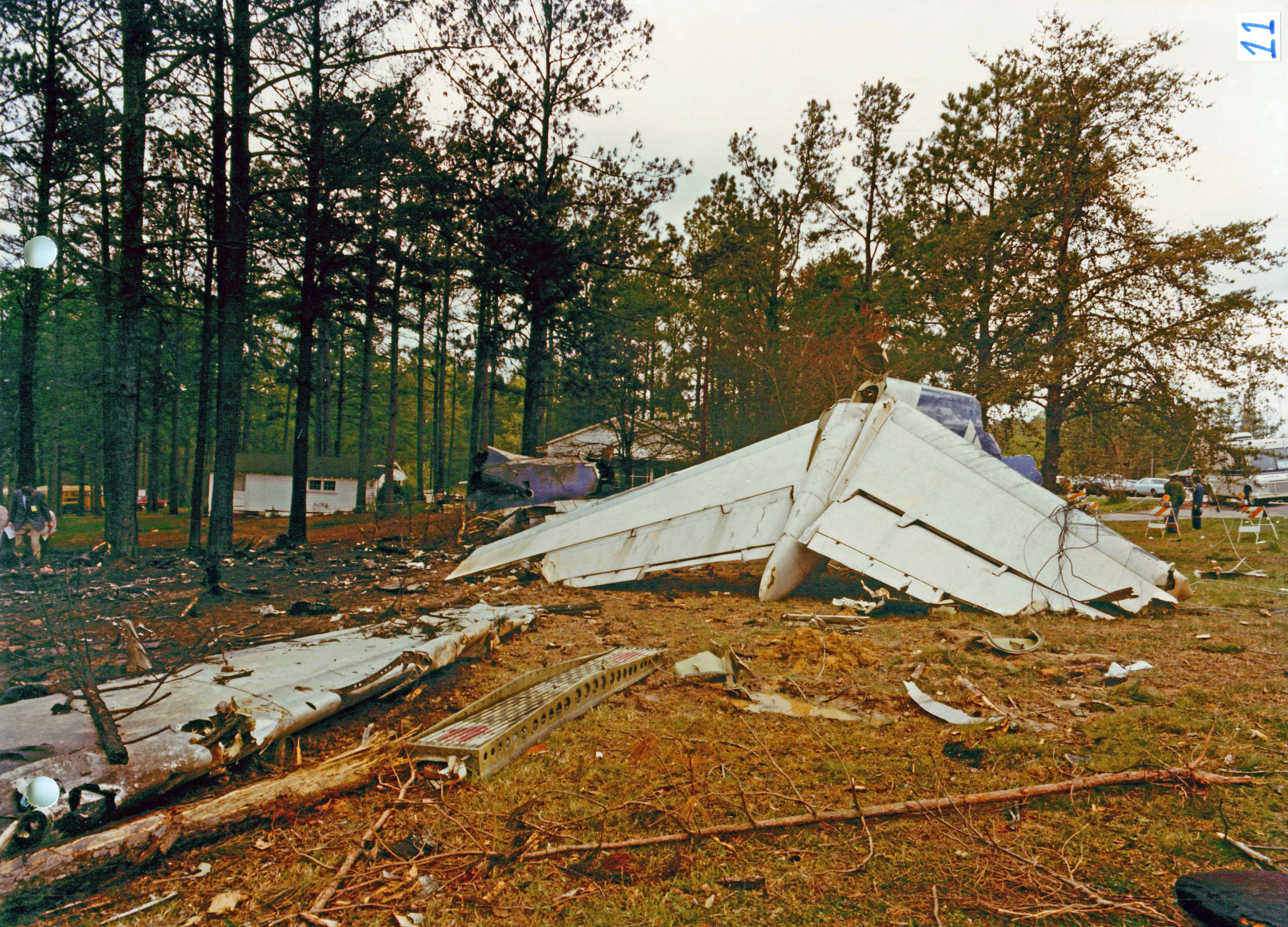
The remnants of the tail section of Southern Airways Flight 242. The separated right wing is in the foreground.

The area in and around Dallas was originally held by the Muscogee people, but they eventually lost their land in battle to the Cherokee in 1755. The area became a crossroads for the Cherokee who lived in the area.

When gold was discovered in Georgia in 1828, it began what was known as the Georgia Gold Rush. Paulding County was soon separated into 40-acre "gold lots" during the Gold Lottery of 1832 and people came from other parts of Georgia and other states to seek gold. The settlers found little gold in the area, with only small amounts being found in mines at Lost Mountain. Many settlers began using their parcels of land to grow crops instead.

During the time the Georgia Gold Rush began to happen, the Cherokee people began to be forced off of their lands. Not long after, the Indian Removal Act was signed by president Andrew Jackson, effectively removing the Native Americans to Indian Territory west of the Mississippi River on the Trail of Tears.

When the Georgia General Assembly took the original western portion of Paulding County to create Polk County in 1852, it also took with it the original county seat, Van Wert. The legislature ceded western portions of Cobb County to create the newly drawn Paulding County, thus making it necessary for the creation of a new town to serve as the county seat. The town of Dallas was officially created from 40 acres (160,000 m^{2}) of land purchased from Garrett H. Spinks on May 14, 1852, for $1000. Its first commissioners were James H. Ballinger, James S. Hackett, Hezekiah Harrison, John S. Poole, and Garrett H. Spinks. The new town of Dallas was named for then-Vice President of the United States, George Mifflin Dallas, of Pennsylvania. He served under President James Knox Polk, for whom the new county to the west had been named.

The Dallas area is home to multiple battle sites that were part of the Atlanta campaign in the American Civil War in 1864. The Battle of Dallas took place near downtown Dallas. The Battle of New Hope Church and the Battle of Pickett's Mill were also fought during the same week, both of which are typically considered to part of Battle of Dallas engagement. The original earthworks, including the battle trenches have been preserved at both the New Hope Church site and at the Pickett's Mill Historic Battlefield Site.

After the reconstruction period, Dallas and Paulding County began to flourish. Construction of the Southern and Seaboard Railroads began in 1882. Paulding County was also introduced to the textile industry at this time. Both industries played a great role in the growth of the county. Along with the introduction to the railroad and the textile industry, Paulding County's first newspaper was introduced, The Dallas New Era.

On October 18, 1903, "Ole 88" Engine 345, a steam-powered locomotive, jumped its tracks and tore down part of the Pumpkinvine Creek Trestle. The Pumpkinvine Creek Trestle, which was originally built in 1901, was rebuilt after the accident. The trestle is over 750 feet long and towers 126 feet above Pumpkinvine Creek. The trestle was restored in 1999 and now serves as part of the Silver Comet Trail.

In 1951, the name of the Town of Dallas, Georgia was changed to the City of Dallas, Georgia. The name change was accomplished to comply with federal legislation allowing "cities" to create housing authorities and other federal-related entities.

In the early 2000s, the city completed a major refurbishment of downtown Dallas, which included adding and updating sidewalks, adding red brick to the roadways, creation of a large courtyard in the center of town, updating existing structural facades, adding a fountain area near the downtown gazebo, and further preserving historic downtown structures.

== Geography ==
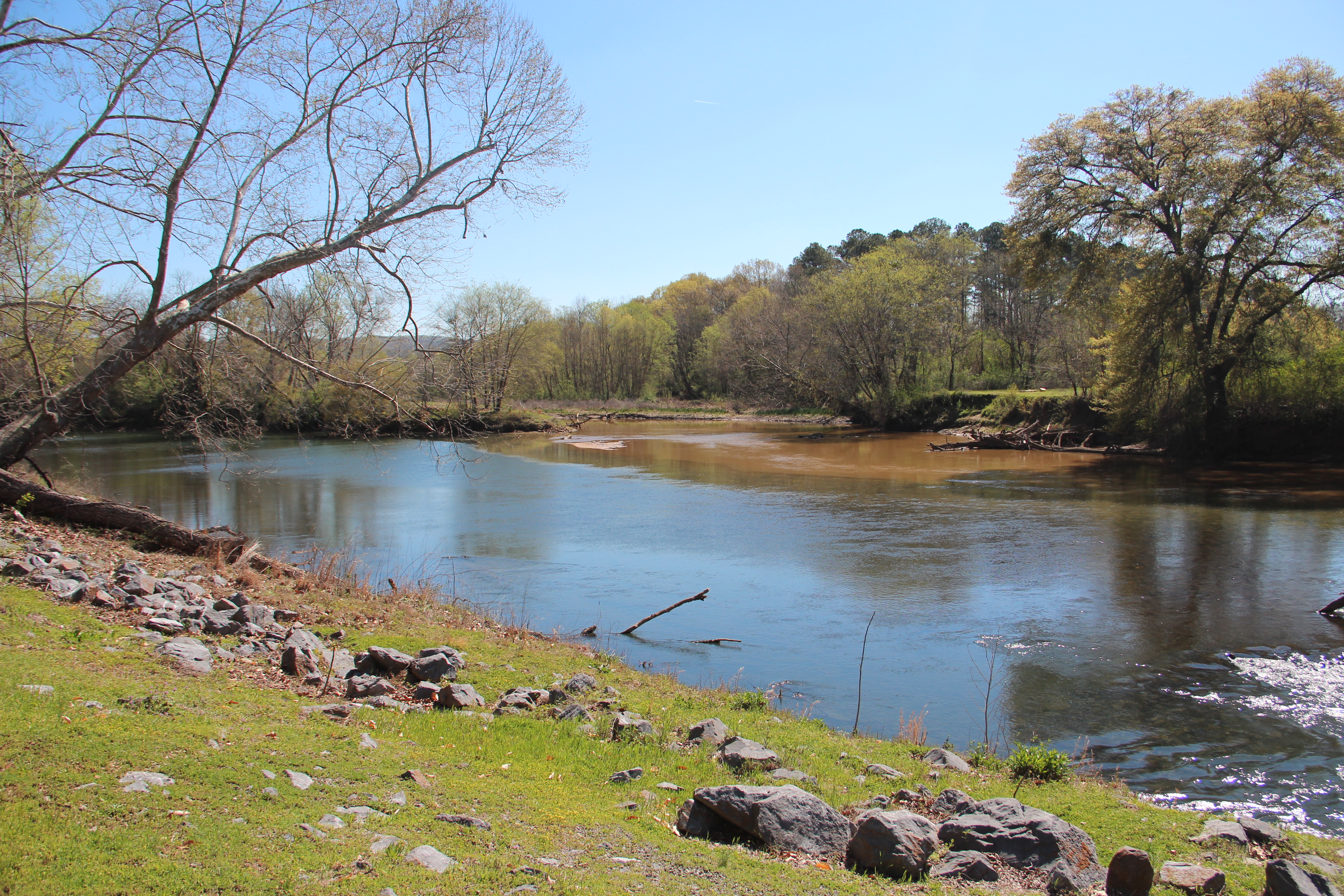
Confluence of the Etowah River and Pumpkinvine Creek

Dallas is located at 33°55′7″N 84°50′27″W (33.918499, -84.840848).

According to the United States Census Bureau, the city has a total area of 4.5 square miles (12 km^{2}), of which 4.5 square miles (12 km^{2}) is land and 0.04 square miles (0.10 km^{2}) (0.66%) is water.

Dallas is part of the Deep South cultural and geographic subregion. The city has an elevation of 1,043 feet (318 m), which makes it one of the highest elevation suburban cities in the Atlanta metropolitan area. Dallas is also a part of the physiographic region of the greater Appalachian Mountains.

The tallest point in Dallas is Elsberry Mountain, which is 1,310 feet (400 m) in elevation at its summit. The second-highest point is Ray Mountain, with an elevation of 1,252 feet (382 m).

The drainage area for all waterways flowing through the area are classified as being in the Alabama-Coosa-Tallapoosa River Basin. There are no major rivers that flow through Dallas itself, but there are multiple large creeks, with the largest being Pumpkinvine Creek, which is a tributary of the Etowah River. Both Lake Allatoona and Lake Acworth are less than 15 miles (24 km) away from Dallas.

=== Climate ===
Monthly normal and record high and low temperatures
Mon.	Avg. high	Avg. low	Avg.	Rec. high	Rec. low
Jan	52 °F (11 °C)	30 °F (−1 °C)	39 °F (4 °C)	80 °F (27 °C)	−12 °F (−24 °C)
Feb	55 °F (13 °C)	32 °F (0 °C)	43 °F (6 °C)	80 °F (27 °C)	−2 °F (−19 °C)
Mar	63 °F (17 °C)	38 °F (3 °C)	51 °F (11 °C)	86 °F (30 °C)	7 °F (−14 °C)
Apr	72 °F (22 °C)	45 °F (7 °C)	59 °F (15 °C)	93 °F (34 °C)	21 °F (−6 °C)
May	78 °F (26 °C)	54 °F (12 °C)	66 °F (19 °C)	96 °F (36 °C)	32 °F (0 °C)
Jun	86 °F (30 °C)	63 °F (17 °C)	74 °F (23 °C)	101 °F (38 °C)	40 °F (4 °C)
Jul	89 °F (32 °C)	67 °F (19 °C)	78 °F (26 °C)	110 °F (43 °C)	50 °F (10 °C)
Aug	88 °F (31 °C)	66 °F (19 °C)	77 °F (25 °C)	103 °F (39 °C)	48 °F (9 °C)
Sep	82 °F (28 °C)	61 °F (16 °C)	72 °F (22 °C)	99 °F (37 °C)	30 °F (−1 °C)
Oct	72 °F (22 °C)	47 °F (8 °C)	60 °F (16 °C)	92 °F (33 °C)	22 °F
Nov	62 °F (17 °C)	39 °F (4 °C)	51 °F (11 °C)	86 °F (30 °C)	9 °F (−13 °C)
Dec	53 °F (12 °C)	32 °F (0 °C)	43 °F (6 °C)	79 °F (26 °C)	−4 °F (−20 °C)

Dallas has a humid subtropical climate that is local to all of Georgia. The average yearly precipitation is 54.43 inches (1,383 mm). The average annual high temperature is 71.8 °F (22.1 °C), while the average annual low temperature is 48.3 °F (9.1 °C).

Snow flurries occasionally fall in the winter months, when there is the presence of a deep trough in the jet stream over the eastern third of the United States. Although at times significant amounts of snowfall have been recorded, some years have no measurable snowfall. The Storm of the Century in March 1993 brought 17.5 inches (440 mm) to Dallas, with drifts measuring several feet. In December 2017, Dallas recorded 12 inches (300 mm) of snow that had fallen within a two-day period. The 12 inches (300 mm) that fell in Dallas was tied for the highest total amount of snowfall in the Atlanta metro area, with the Carter's Lake area being the only other place to receive that amount.

The coldest temperature ever recorded in Dallas was −12 °F (−24 °C) in 2010. The warmest temperature ever recorded was 110 °F (43 °C) in 2012.

== Demographics ==
Historical population
Census	Pop.	Note	%±
1880	169		—
1890	455		169.2%
1900	644		41.5%
1910	1,259		95.5%
1920	1,245		−1.1%
1930	1,412		13.4%
1940	1,922		36.1%
1950	1,817		−5.5%
1960	2,065		13.6%
1970	2,133		3.3%
1980	2,508		17.6%
1990	2,810		12.0%
2000	5,056		79.9%
2010	11,544		128.3%
2020	14,042		21.6%
2025 (est.)	15,402	▲	9.7%
U.S. Decennial Census; 2025

=== 2020 census ===
As of the 2020 census, Dallas had a population of 14,042 and 3,275 families residing in the city. The median age was 33.6 years. 27.6% of residents were under the age of 18 and 12.6% of residents were 65 years of age or older. For every 100 females there were 82.9 males, and for every 100 females age 18 and over there were 77.4 males age 18 and over.

99.5% of residents lived in urban areas, while 0.5% lived in rural areas.

There were 5,230 households in Dallas, of which 40.2% had children under the age of 18 living in them. Of all households, 37.5% were married-couple households, 16.9% were households with a male householder and no spouse or partner present, and 37.3% were households with a female householder and no spouse or partner present. About 26.8% of all households were made up of individuals and 10.9% had someone living alone who was 65 years of age or older.

There were 5,459 housing units, of which 4.2% were vacant. The homeowner vacancy rate was 1.7% and the rental vacancy rate was 4.8%.

Dallas racial composition
Race	Num.	Perc.
White (non-Hispanic)	6,609	47.07%
Black or African American (non-Hispanic)	5,073	36.13%
Native American	24	0.17%
Asian	184	1.31%
Pacific Islander	11	0.08%
Other/mixed-race	797	5.68%
Hispanic or Latino	1,344	9.57%

=== 2010–2014 estimates ===
The median value of owner-occupied housing units between 2010 and 2014 was $110,200 (U.S.Census).

The median income for a household in the city was $33,750, and the median income for a family was $38,308. Males had a median income of $30,245 versus $21,747 for females. The per capita income for the city was $18,461. About 19.8% of families and 23.7% of the population were below the poverty line, including 17.3% of those under age 18 and 13.3% of those age 65 or over.

== Economy ==
Employers include Chattahoochee Technical College and Georgia Highlands College.

== Arts and culture ==
Paulding County Courthouse in Dallas is listed on the National Register of Historic Places.

The Dallas Concert Series has featured Night Ranger, Chris Janson, and Mother's Finest.

== Parks and recreation ==
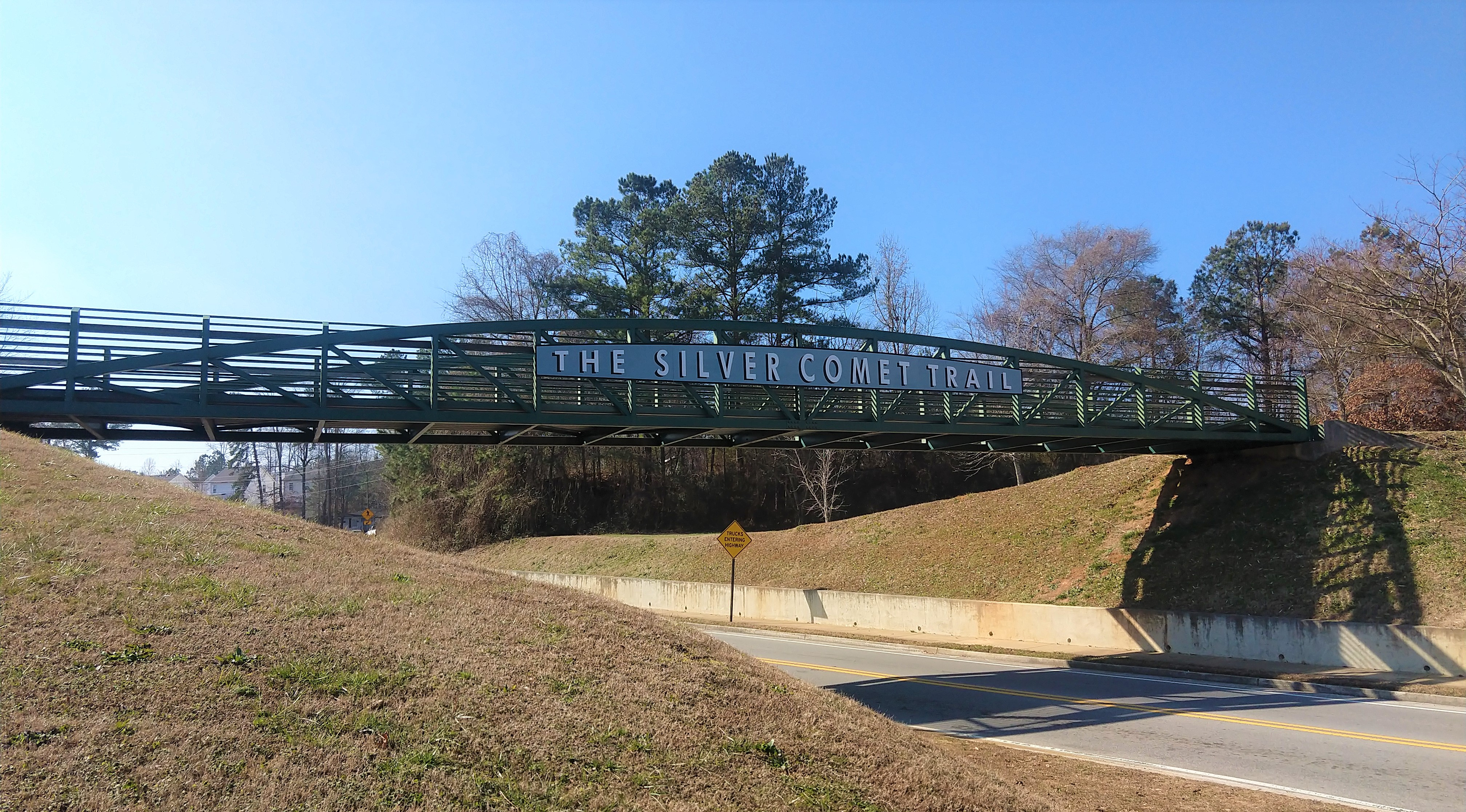
Silver Comet Trail in Dallas

The Silver Comet Trail is a 61-acre (25 ha) paved rail trail erected on the abandoned Seaboard Air Line Railroad that was built in the 1890s. The railway served as the primary passenger train route between New York City, Atlanta, and Birmingham, Alabama, via the Silver Comet streamliner train, discontinued in 1969. It is the second-longest rail trail in the United States.

== Education ==
=== Primary and secondary schools ===
==== Public schools ====
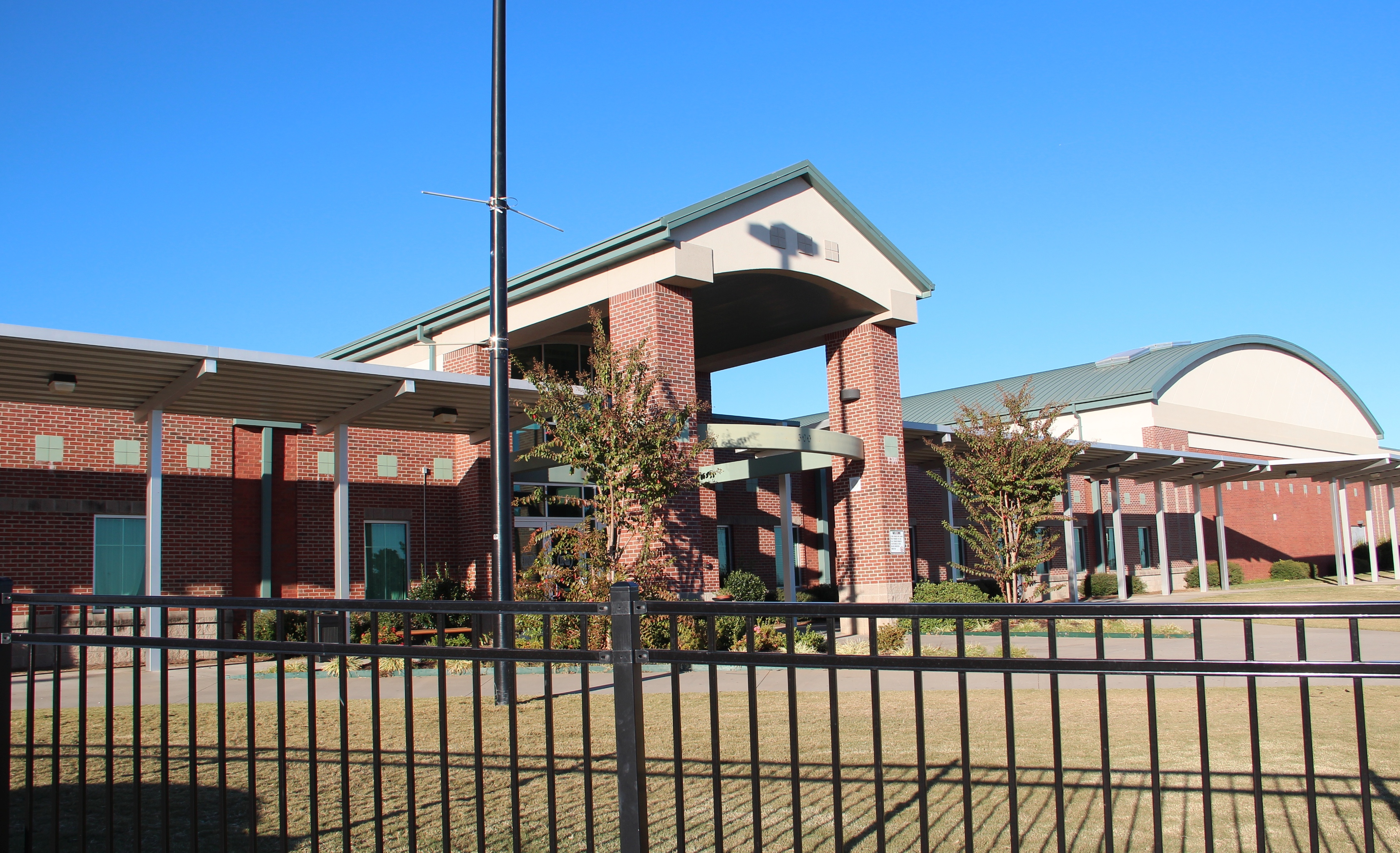
North Paulding High School

The Paulding County School District is a public school district that consists of pre-school to grade 12, and consists of 19 elementary schools, nine middle schools, and five high schools. The district has 1,212 full-time teachers and over 19,283 students.

=== Private schools ===
- Brighton Private School
- Victory Christian Academy

=== Higher education ===
- Georgia Highlands College (Paulding site)
- Kennesaw State University (Paulding site)
- Chattahoochee Technical College

=== High schools ===
- North Paulding High School
- Paulding County High School
- East Paulding High School

== Media ==
=== Television ===
Comcast Channel 24 airs news, information, upcoming event descriptions, dates and times, and photos of other events. The government-access television (GATV) cable channel provides key information to residents of Dallas and Paulding County. It also airs shorts on how to conserve water and electricity as well as messages from the mayor and other city board members.

=== Radio ===
- WDJY (FM)/99.1 - talk
- WDPC (AM)/1500 - Christian/gospel

=== Film ===
Movies and television series that have been filmed in Dallas include Finding Steve McQueen, The Last Full Measure, MacGyver, and Stargirl.

== Infrastructure ==
=== Transportation ===
==== Major roads ====
- U.S. Route 278
- State Route 6
- State Route 61
- State Route 120
- State Route 381

==== Airports ====
To the west of Dallas is the Silver Comet Field at Paulding Northwest Atlanta Airport, which is a general aviation airport. It is the ninth local airport in metro Atlanta, and the first new jet-capable airport in Georgia since 1975.

== Notable people ==
- Cecil Butler, professional baseball player
- Chris Conley, American football wide receiver for the Jacksonville Jaguars
- Jayne County, punk rock star
- Christopher Dudley, keyboardist of UnderOATH
- Caleb Lee Hutchinson, runner-up on season 16 of American Idol
- John Leggett, insurance broker, actor, singer
- Patty Loveless, country musician
- Kelly Nelon Clark, southern gospel singer with Nelon Family Singers, performs regularly with Bill Gaither Home Coming Friends
- Gary North, Christian economic historian and publisher
- Riley Puckett, country music artist, best known as a member of Gid Tanner and the Skillet Lickers
- Wilbur Rakestraw, racing driver
- Ray Traylor (1963–2004), professional wrestler, best known for his appearances with World Wrestling Entertainment under the ring name Big Boss Man
- Travis Tritt, country music star
- Zack Wheeler, pitcher, #6 overall pick in the 2009 Major League Baseball draft for the San Francisco Giants

== Gallery ==
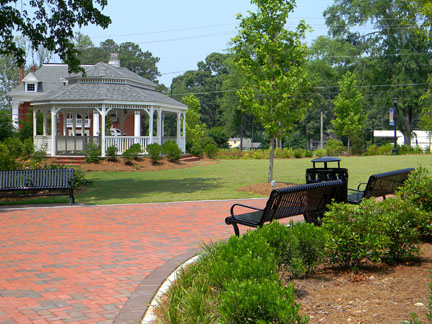
Civil War Trailhead Park on Main Street

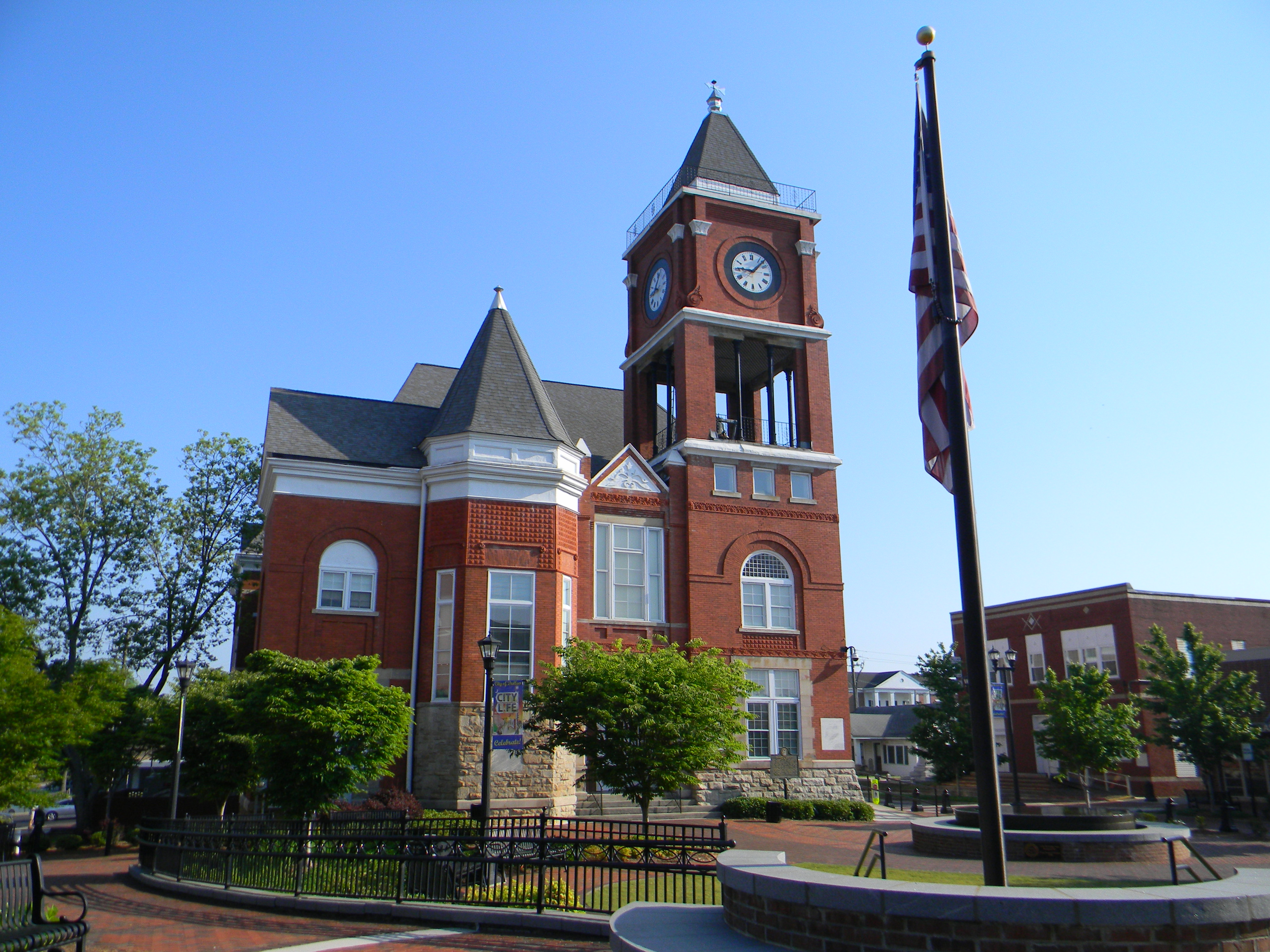
Historical Paulding County Courthouse

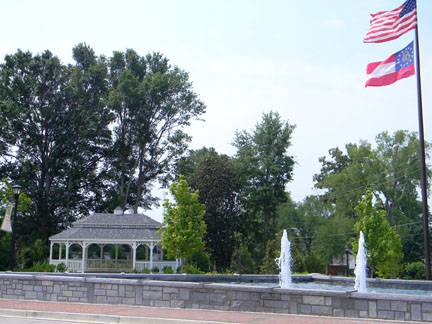
Civil War Trailhead fountains
