= Hiram, Georgia =

- City
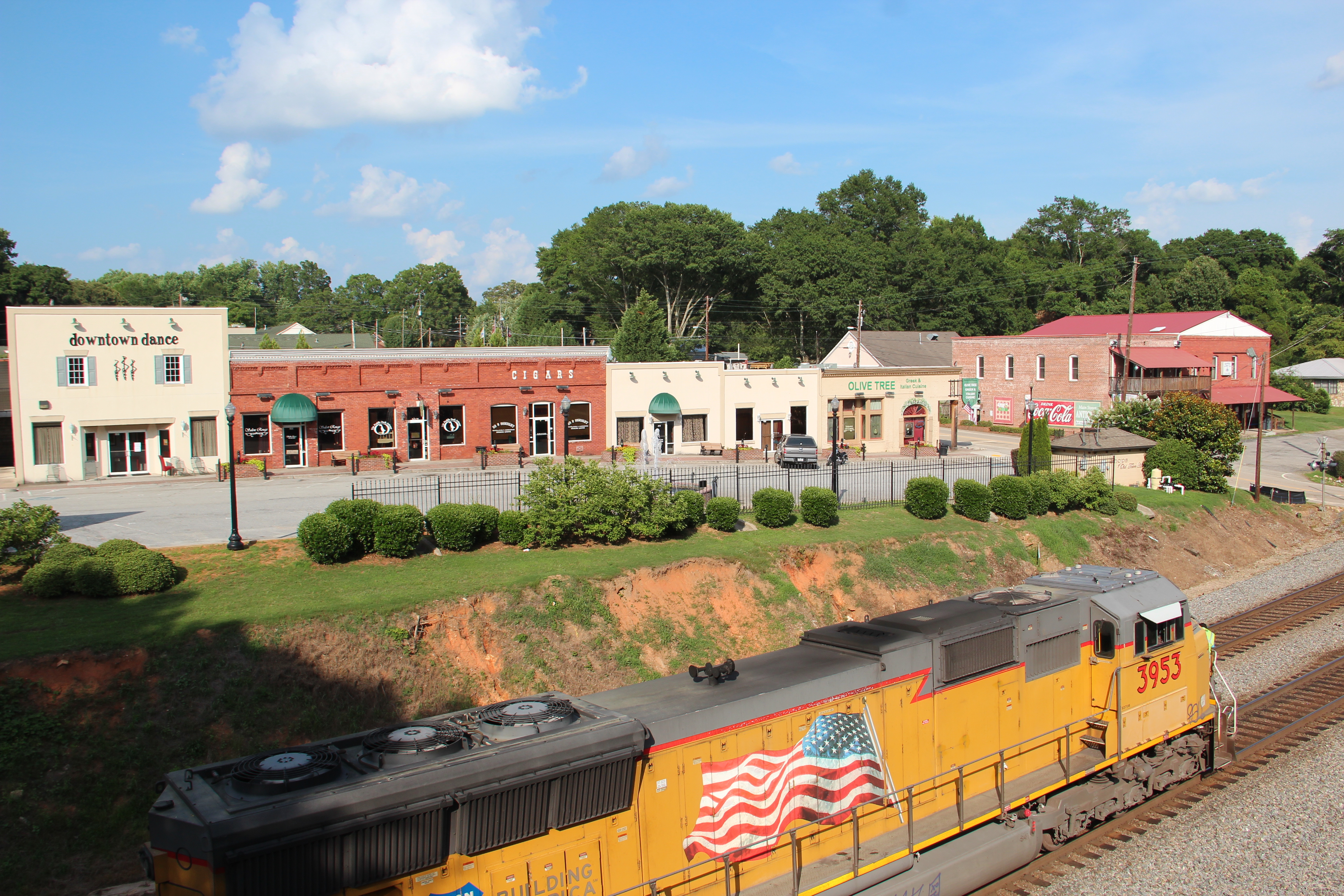
- Downtown Hiram

- Flag Seal

- Location in Paulding County and the state of Georgia

- Location in Metro Atlanta
- Coordinates: 33°51′56″N 84°46′29″W
- Country: United States
- State: Georgia
- County: Paulding

Government
  - Mayor: Frank Moran

Area
  - Total: 3.96 sq mi (10.25 km^{2})
  - Land: 3.93 sq mi (10.18 km^{2})
  - Water: 0.023 sq mi (0.06 km^{2})
- Elevation: 965 ft (294 m)

Population (2020)
  - Total: 4,929
  - Density: 1,254/sq mi (484.1/km^{2})
- Time zone: UTC-5 (Eastern (EST))
  - Summer (DST): UTC-4 (EDT)
- ZIP code: 30141
- Area codes: 770/678/470
- FIPS code: 13-39076
- GNIS feature ID: 0331996
- Website: cityofhiramga.gov

Hiram (/Hai:rm/) is a city in Paulding County, Georgia, United States. It is approximately part of Metro Atlanta. As of the 2020 census, the population is 4,929. It is east of the County seat of Dallas

== History ==
The Georgia General Assembly incorporated the Town of Hiram in 1891. The city was named after Hiram Baggett, the town's first postmaster.

== Geography ==
Hiram is located at 33°51′56″N 84°46′29″W (33.865575, -84.774593).

According to the United States Census Bureau, the city has a total area of 3.0 square miles (7.8 km^{2}), of which 3.0 square miles (7.8 km^{2}) is land and 0.04 square miles (0.10 km^{2}) (0.66%) is water.

At the intersection of US Highway 278 and Georgia State Route 92, Atlanta's tallest buildings can be seen, specifically the Bank of America Tower, which stands 23 miles away from the junction.

Via GA-92, Acworth is 18 mi (29 km) to the north, and Douglasville is 9 mi (14 km) to the south. Via US-278, Dallas is 8 mi (13 km) to the northwest, and Powder Springs is 5 mi (8 km) to the east.

== Demographics ==
Historical population
Census	Pop.	Note	%±
1900	105		—
1910	254		141.9%
1920	329		29.5%
1930	303		−7.9%
1940	282		−6.9%
1950	299		6.0%
1960	358		19.7%
1970	441		23.2%
1980	1,030		133.6%
1990	1,389		34.9%
2000	1,361		−2.0%
2010	3,546		160.5%
2020	4,929		39.0%
2025 (est.)	5,585	▲	13.3%
U.S. Decennial Census; 2025

Recent years have seen a tremendous increase in the populations of Dallas and Hiram, as well as Paulding County.

Dallas and Hiram more than doubled in population from 2000 to 2010, according to figures from the U.S. Census. Dallas, Paulding's county seat, went from an overall population of 5,056 in 2000 to 11,544 in the 2010 census—just over a 128 percent increase.

But Hiram's growth was even more explosive over the last decade, jumping to 3,546 from 1,361—an increase of more than 160 percent.

The county's numbers also swelled, but not at the rate experienced by Dallas and Hiram. From 2000's population of 81,678, the county saw nearly three-quarters of that total adding to its resident count, bringing it to 142,324.

=== 2020 census ===
As of the 2020 census, Hiram had a population of 4,929. The median age was 35.9 years. 27.3% of residents were under the age of 18 and 12.1% of residents were 65 years of age or older. For every 100 females there were 77.6 males, and for every 100 females age 18 and over there were 71.3 males age 18 and over.

100.0% of residents lived in urban areas, while 0.0% lived in rural areas.

There were 1,929 households in Hiram, of which 38.1% had children under the age of 18 living in them. Of all households, 37.6% were married-couple households, 14.2% were households with a male householder and no spouse or partner present, and 42.3% were households with a female householder and no spouse or partner present. About 28.9% of all households were made up of individuals and 11.0% had someone living alone who was 65 years of age or older. There were 1,030 families residing in the city.

There were 2,056 housing units, of which 6.2% were vacant. The homeowner vacancy rate was 3.3% and the rental vacancy rate was 5.1%.

Racial composition as of the 2020 census
Race	Number	Percent
White	1,903	38.6%
Black or African American	2,353	47.7%
American Indian and Alaska Native	31	0.6%
Asian	59	1.2%
Native Hawaiian and Other Pacific Islander	4	0.1%
Some other race	168	3.4%
Two or more races	411	8.3%
Hispanic or Latino (of any race)	471	9.6%

=== 2010 census ===
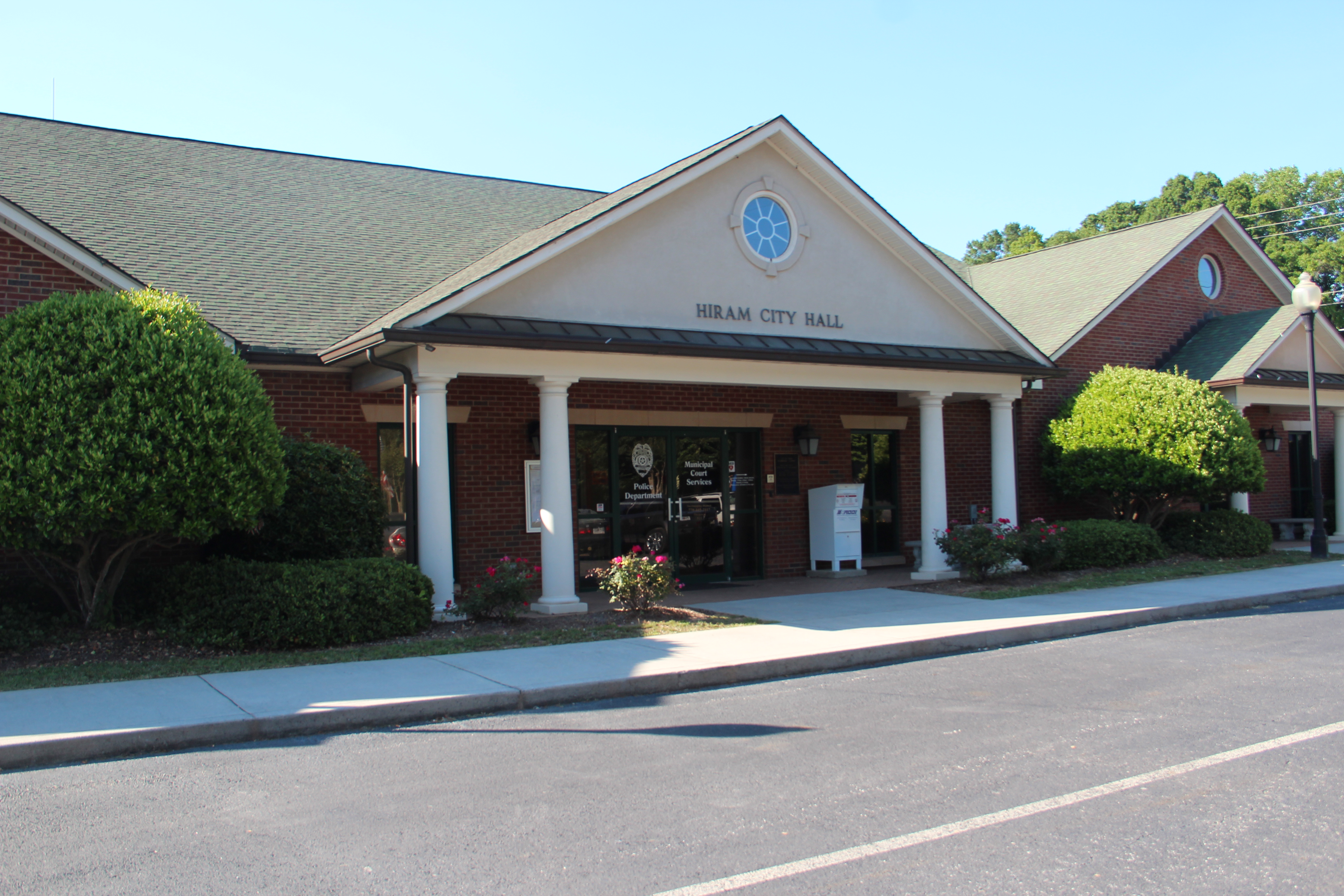
Hiram City Hall

As of the census of 2010, there were 3543 people and 1,538 households residing in the city. The population density in 2000 was 452.5 people per square mile (174.67/km^{2}). There were 506 housing units at an average density of 168.2 per square mile (64.9/km^{2}). The racial makeup of the city in 2010 was 60.88% White, 32% African American, 0.22% Native American, 1.04% Asian, 2.74% from other races, and 3.02% from two or more races. Hispanic or Latino people of any race were 7.54% of the population.

There were 481 households, out of which 38.7% had children under the age of 18 living with them, 55.9% were married couples living together, 14.8% had a female householder with no husband present, and 23.7% were non-families. 19.1% of all households were made up of individuals, and 4.4% had someone living alone who was 65 years of age or older. The average household size was 2.83 and the average family size was 3.20.

In the city, the population was spread out, with 28.4% under the age of 18, 11.4% from 18 to 24, 33.7% from 25 to 44, 19.3% from 45 to 64, and 7.3% who were 65 years of age or older. The median age was 32 years. For every 100 females, there were 99.9 males. For every 100 females age 18 and over, there were 96.2 males.

The median income for a household in the city was $50,069, and the median income for a family was $51,705. Males had a median income of $36,048 versus $24,483 for females. The per capita income for the city was $19,254. About 4.1% of families and 5.2% of the population were below the poverty line, including 6.4% of those under age 18 and none of those age 65 or over.

== Transportation ==
=== Major highways ===
- U.S. Route 278
- State Route 92
- State Route 120
- State Route 6
- State Business Route 6
- State Route 360
- Bill Carruth parkway

== Education ==
The city of Hiram has two public schools named after it, Hiram High School and Hiram Elementary School. The nearest middle schools are Dobbins Middle School, P.B. Ritch Middle School and East Paulding Middle School.

== Recreation ==
- Silver Comet Trail
- Ben Hill Strickland Park
