= List of colleges and universities in California =

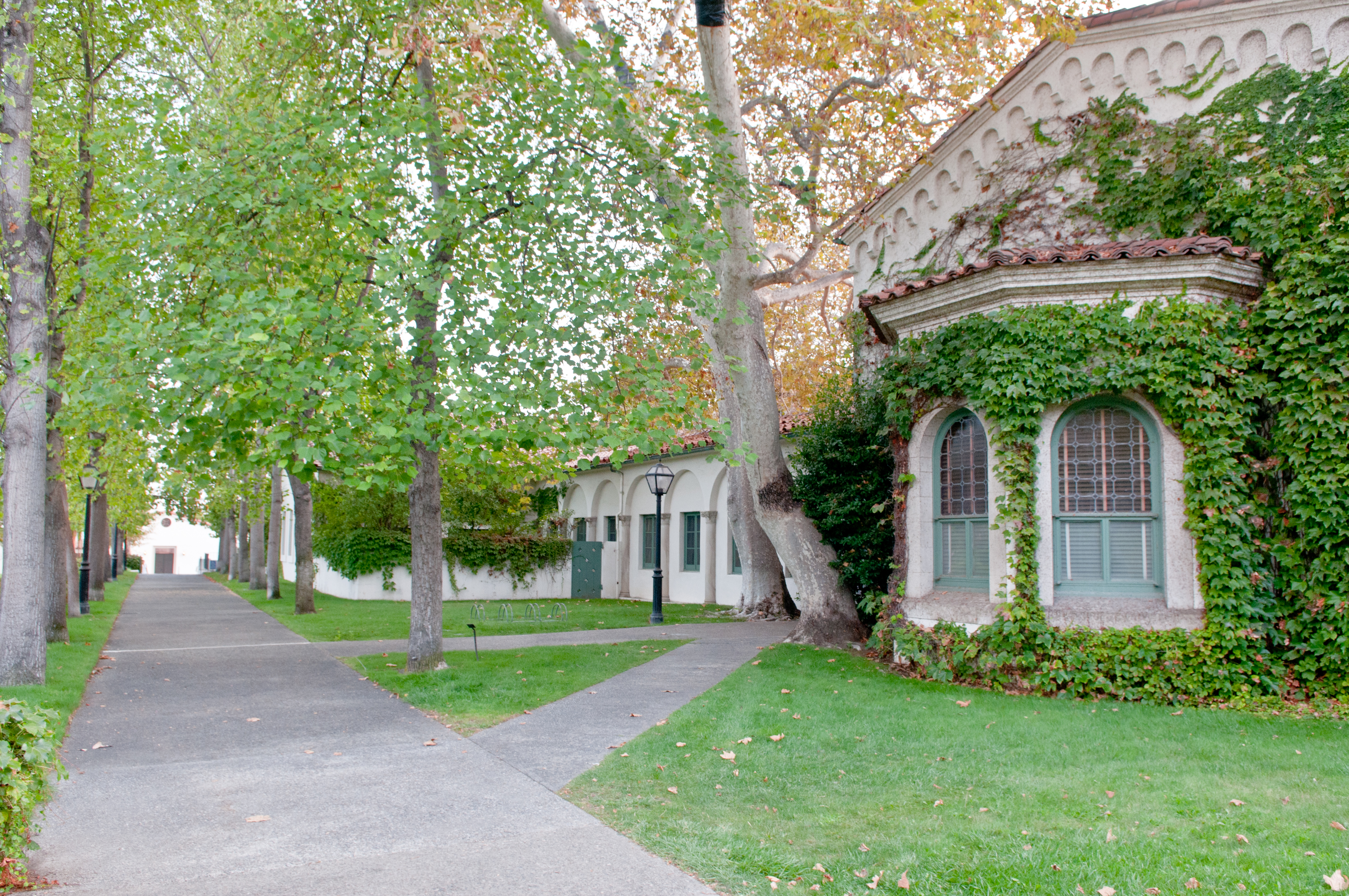
Scripps College in Claremont

This is a list of colleges and universities in California.

== Federal institutions ==
=== Graduate institutions ===
- Naval Postgraduate School (Monterey)

=== Other academic institutions ===
- Defense Language Institute (Monterey)

== State institutions ==
=== Two-year institutions ===
- See: List of California Community Colleges

=== Four-year institutions ===
==== University of California ====
Name	City	County	Enrollment (Fall 2024)	Founded	Athletics
University of California, Berkeley	Berkeley	Alameda	45,882	1869	NCAA Div. I (ACC, MPSF, America East)
University of California, Davis	Davis	Yolo	40,065	1905	NCAA Div. I (Big Sky, MPSF, Big West, America East)
University of California, Irvine	Irvine	Orange	37,297	1965	NCAA Div. I (Big West, MPSF, GCC)
University of California, Los Angeles	Los Angeles	Los Angeles	47,335	1882*	NCAA Div. I (Big Ten, MPSF)
University of California, Merced	Merced	Merced	9,110	2005	NCAA Div. II (CCAA)
University of California, Riverside	Riverside	Riverside	26,384	1954	NCAA Div. I (Big West)
University of California, San Diego	San Diego	San Diego	44,256	1960	NCAA Div. I (Big West, MPSF)
University of California, Santa Barbara	Santa Barbara	Santa Barbara	26,133	1891**	NCAA Div. I (Big West, MPSF, GCC)
University of California, Santa Cruz	Santa Cruz	Santa Cruz	19,938	1965	NCAA Div. III (C2C, ASC)

*University of California, Los Angeles was founded in 1882 as the southern branch of the California State Normal School. It joined the University of California system in 1919 as the southern branch of the University of California.

**University of California, Santa Barbara was founded in 1891 as an independent teachers' college. It joined the University of California system in 1944.

==== California State University ====
Name	City	County	Enrollment (Fall 2024)	Founded	Athletics
California Polytechnic State University, San Luis Obispo	San Luis Obispo	San Luis Obispo	23,069	1901*	NCAA Div. I (Big West, Big Sky, Pac-12, MPSF)
California State Polytechnic University, Humboldt	Arcata	Humboldt	6,237	1913	NCAA Div. II (CCAA, GNAC)
California State Polytechnic University, Pomona	Pomona	Los Angeles	27,636	1938**	NCAA Div. II (CCAA)
California State University, Bakersfield	Bakersfield	Kern	10,419	1965	NCAA Div. I (Big West, MPSF, Pac-12)
California State University Channel Islands	Camarillo	Ventura	5,592	2002	None
California State University, Chico	Chico	Butte	15,257	1887	NCAA Div. II (CCAA)
California State University, Dominguez Hills	Carson	Los Angeles	15,182	1960	NCAA Div. II (CCAA)
California State University, East Bay	Hayward	Alameda	12,326	1957	NCAA Div. II (CCAA, WWPA)
California State University, Fresno	Fresno	Fresno	24,427	1911	NCAA Div. I (Mountain West, Big 12, MPSF, GCC, NCEA)
California State University, Fullerton	Fullerton	Orange	43,662	1957	NCAA Div. I (Big West, MPSF)
California State University, Long Beach	Long Beach	Los Angeles	42,003	1949	NCAA Div. I (Big West, MPSF, GCC)
California State University, Los Angeles	Los Angeles	Los Angeles	23,163	1947	NCAA Div. II (CCAA, PacWest)
California State University, Monterey Bay	Seaside-Marina	Monterey	7,713	1994	NCAA Div. II (CCAA)
California State University, Northridge	Northridge	Los Angeles	38,313	1958	NCAA Div. I (Big West, MPSF)
California State University, Sacramento	Sacramento	Sacramento	31,943	1947	NCAA Div. I (Big Sky, WAC, AAC, Big West)
California State University, San Bernardino	San Bernardino	San Bernardino	18,492	1965	NCAA Div. II (CCAA)
California State University San Marcos	San Marcos	San Diego	16,237	1988	NCAA Div. II (CCAA)
California State University, Stanislaus	Turlock	Stanislaus	9,724	1957	NCAA Div. II (CCAA, PacWest)
San Diego State University	San Diego	San Diego	41,137	1897	NCAA Div. I (Mountain West)
San Francisco State University	San Francisco	San Francisco	22,563	1899	NCAA Div. II (CCAA)
San Jose State University	San Jose	Santa Clara	37,661	1857	NCAA Div. I (Mountain West, WAC, MPSF, WCC, Southland)
Sonoma State University	Rohnert Park	Sonoma	5,891	1960	NCAA Div. II (CCAA)

*California Polytechnic State University, San Luis Obispo was founded as a vocational high school. It became a vocational school in 1924, and then started awarding bachelor's degrees in 1940.

**California State Polytechnic University, Pomona, was founded as a southern branch of California State Polytechnic University, San Luis Obispo in 1938, but became independent in 1966.

=== State graduate institutions ===
Name	City	County	Founded
California State University, Moss Landing Marine Laboratories	Moss Landing	Monterey	1966
University of California College of the Law, San Francisco	San Francisco	San Francisco	1878
University of California, San Francisco	San Francisco	San Francisco	1899

== Private institutions ==
Name	City	Founded	Carnegie Classification (Note: Classification are based on the Carnegie Classification of Institutions of Higher Education.)	Profit (Note: School types are based on the control classification of the Carnegie Classification of Institutions of Higher Education.)	Enrollment (fall 2024)
Abraham Lincoln University	Glendale	1996	Special Focus: Law	for-profit	112
Academy for Jewish Religion	Los Angeles	2000	Special Focus: Theological Studies	not-for-profit (Jewish)	58
Academy of Art University	San Francisco	1929	Special Focus Four-Year: Arts, Music & Design Schools	for-profit	5,498
Academy of Chinese Culture and Health Sciences	Oakland	1982	Special Focus: Other Health Professions	not-for-profit	114
Acupuncture and Integrative Medicine College	Berkeley	1929	Special Focus: Other Health Professions	not-for-profit	115
AFI Conservatory	Los Angeles	1969	Special Focus: Arts, Music, and Design	not-for-profit	379
Alder Graduate School of Education	Redwood City	2010	Special Focus: Graduate Studies	not-for-profit	558
Alhambra Medical University	Alhambra	2005	Special Focus: Other Health Professions	for-profit	140
Alliant University	San Diego	1952	Doctoral Universities: Moderate Research Activity	for-profit	4,530
America Evangelical University	Gardena	2004	Special Focus: Graduate Studies	not-for-profit	307
American Career College	Anaheim, Los Angeles, Ontario	1978	Special Focus: Applied and Career Studies	for-profit	6,054
American Heritage University of Southern California	Ontario	2003	Not classified	for-profit	---
American Jewish University	Los Angeles	1947	Baccalaureate Colleges: Arts & Sciences Focus	not-for-profit (Jewish)	424
American Management University	California	2018	Not classified	Exempt verified private university, International Alliance of Business Professionals (IABP)	---
American Medical Sciences Center	Glendale	1996	Special Focus: Applied and Career Studies	for-profit	365
American University of Health Sciences	Signal Hill	1994	Special Focus: Nursing	for-profit	473
Anaheim University	Anaheim	1996	Not classified	for-profit	---
Angeles College	Los Angeles	2004	Special Focus: Other Health Professions	for-profit	603
Antioch University Los Angeles	Los Angeles	1972	Master's Colleges & Universities	not-for-profit	910
Antioch University Santa Barbara	Santa Barbara	1977	Master's Colleges & Universities	not-for-profit	263
ArtCenter College of Design	Pasadena	1930	Special Focus Four-Year: Arts, Music & Design Schools	not-for-profit	2,308
Asher College	Sacramento	1998	Special Focus: Applied and Career Studies	for-profit	649
ATA College	El Cajon	1994	Special Focus: Applied and Career Studies	for-profit	80
ATI College	Whittier	1998	Special Focus: Other Health Professions	for-profit	149
Azusa Pacific University	Azusa	1899	Doctoral Universities: Moderate Research Activity	not-for-profit (Christian)	6,272
Berkeley School of Theology	Berkeley	1996	Special Focus: Theological Studies	not-for-profit	108
Bethesda University	Anaheim	1976	Special Focus: Business	not-for-profit	263
Biola University	La Mirada	1908	Doctoral Universities: Moderate Research Activity	not-for-profit (Evangelical Christian)	5,434
California Academy of Studio Arts	San Francisco	2025	Experimental, non-accredited fine arts interdisciplinary studio program	not-for-profit	30
California Aeronautical University	Bakersfield	2016	Professions-focused Baccalaureate	for-profit	350
California Baptist University	Riverside	1950	Master's Colleges & Universities: Larger Programs	not-for-profit (Southern Baptist)	11,902
California Career College	Canoga Park	2001	Special Focus: Nursing	for-profit	190
California Coast University	Santa Ana	1973	Not classified	for-profit	---
California Health Sciences University	Clovis	2012	Doctoral Universities: Health Professions Schools	for-profit	607
California Institute of Advanced Management	Alhambra	2011	Special Focus: Business	not-for-profit	344
California Institute of Applied Technology	Glendale	2008	Special Focus: Applied and Career Studies	for-profit	2,112
California Institute of Integral Studies	San Francisco	1968	Doctoral Universities: Moderate Research Activity	not-for-profit	1,874
California Institute of Technology	Pasadena	1891	Doctoral Universities: Highest Research Activity	not-for-profit	2,430
California Institute of the Arts	Valencia	1961	Special Focus Four-Year: Arts, Music & Design Schools	not-for-profit	1,277
California Lutheran University	Thousand Oaks	1959	Master's Colleges & Universities: Larger Programs	not-for-profit (Lutheran)	3,351
California Miramar University	San Diego	2005	Special Focus Four-Year: Business & Management Schools	for-profit	247
California Metropolitan University	Montclair	2020	Exempt verified private university, International Alliance of Business Professionals (IABP)	non-profit sponsored	---
California Northstate University College of Medicine	Elk Grove	2007	Special Focus: Medical Schools and Centers	for-profit	981
California South Bay University	Sunnyvale	2007	Not classified		---
California University of Management and Sciences	Anaheim	1998	Master's Colleges & Universities: Medium Programs	not-for-profit	---
California University of Science and Medicine	Colton	2015	Special Focus:Graduate Studies	not-for-profit	590
California Western School of Law	San Diego	1924	Special Focus: Law	not-for-profit	650
Career Care Institute	Lancaster	1998	Special Focus: Nursing	for-profit	620
Career Networks Institute	Santa Ana	1994	Special Focus: Nursing	for-profit	1,133
Carrington College	Pleasant Hill, Sacramento, San Jose, San Leandro, Stockton	1967	Special Focus: Applied and Career Studies	for-profit	4,030
Casa Loma College-Los Angeles	Sherman Oaks	1966	Special Focus: Applied and Career Studies	not-for-profit	759
CBD College	Los Angeles	1982	Special Focus: Applied and Career Studies	not-for-profit	1,581
Central Coast College	Salinas	1983	Special Focus: Applied and Career Studies	for-profit	631
Chamberlain University	Irwindale & Rancho Cordova	1889	Special Focus: Nursing	for-profit	751
Chapman University	Orange	1861	Doctoral Universities: High Research Activity	not-for-profit (Christian Church (Disciples of Christ))	9,760
Charles R. Drew University of Medicine and Science	Willowbrook	1966	Special Focus Four-Year: Other Health Professions Schools	not-for-profit	852
Church Divinity School of the Pacific	Berkeley	1893	Special Focus: Theological Studies	not-for-profit	40
Claremont Graduate University	Claremont	1925	Doctoral Universities: Higher Research Activity	not-for-profit	1,771
Claremont Lincoln University	Claremont	2011	Master's Colleges & Universities: Small Programs	not-for-profit	271
Claremont McKenna College	Claremont	1946	Baccalaureate Colleges: Arts & Sciences Focus	not-for-profit	1,393
Claremont School of Theology	Claremont	1885	Special Focus: Theological Studies	not-for-profit	213
Concorde Career College	Garden Grove, North Hollywood, San Bernardino, San Diego	1968	Special Focus: Applied and Career Studies	for-profit	741
Concordia University Irvine	Irvine	1976	Master's Colleges & Universities: Larger Programs	not-for-profit (Lutheran)	3,658
Contra Costa Medical Career College	Antioch	2007	Special Focus: Applied and Career Studies	for-profit	556
Daybreak University	Anaheim	2012	Special Focus: Other Health Professions	not-for-profit	145
Deep Springs College	Deep Springs	1917	Associate's college	not-for-profit	---
Design Institute of San Diego	San Diego	1977	Special Focus Four-Year: Arts, Music & Design Schools	for-profit	94
DeVry University	Ontario	1931	Master's Colleges & Universities: Larger Programs	for-profit	2,403
Dharma Realm Buddhist University	Ukiah	1976	Not Classified	Private, not-for-profit (Buddhist)	52
Dominican School of Philosophy and Theology	Berkeley	1851	Special Focus: Theological Studies	not-for-profit	55
Dominican University of California	San Rafael	1890	Master's Colleges & Universities: Medium Programs	not-for-profit (Catholic)	1,900
Dongguk University	Los Angeles	1906	Special Focus: Other Health Professions	not-for-profit	102
Epic Bible College	Sacramento	1974	Special Focus Four-Year: Faith-Related Institutions	not-for-profit (non-denominational Christian)	98
Fielding Graduate University	Santa Barbara	1974	Doctoral Universities	not-for-profit	915
Five Branches University	Santa Cruz	1984	Special Focus: Other Health Professions	for-profit	321
Franciscan School of Theology	San Diego	1854	Special Focus: Theological Studies	not-for-profit	89
Fremont University	Cerritos	1986	Special Focus: Other Health Professions	for-profit	174
Frederick S. Pardee RAND Graduate School	Santa Monica	1970	Special Focus Four-Year: Other Special Focus Institutions	not-for-profit	230
Fresno Pacific University	Fresno	1944	Master's Colleges & Universities: Larger Programs	not-for-profit (Mennonite)	2,879
Fuller Theological Seminary	Pasadena	1947	Special Focus Four-Year: Faith-Related Institutions	not-for-profit (multidenominational Christian)	1,890
Galaxy Medical College	North Hollywood	2003	Special Focus: Other Health Professions	for-profit	111
Gateway Seminary	Ontario	1944	Special Focus: Theological Studies	not-for-profit (Southern Baptist)	---
Glendale Career College	Glendale, Bakersfield, West Covina	1946	Special Focus: Applied and Career Studies	for-profit	1,679
Gnomon	North Hollywood	1997	Special Focus: Arts, Music, and Design	for-profit	526
Golden Gate University	San Francisco	1901	Master's Colleges & Universities: Larger Programs	not-for-profit	3,098
Grace Mission University	Fullerton	1995	Special Focus: Theological Studies	not-for-profit	301
Graduate Theological Union	Berkeley	1962	Special Focus Four-Year: Faith-Related Institutions	not-for-profit	150
Gurnick Academy of Medical Arts	San Mateo, California	2004	Four or more years (Baccalaureate or higher degree)	for-profit	3,437
Harvey Mudd College	Claremont	1955	Baccalaureate Colleges: Arts & Sciences Focus	not-for-profit	951
Haven University	Garden Grove	1969	Special Focus: Business	not-for-profit	123
Healthcare Career College	Paramount	1990	Special Focus: Other Health Professions	for-profit	447
High Desert Medical College	Lancaster	2002	Special Focus: Applied and Career Studies	for-profit	2,280
High Tech High Graduate School of Education	San Diego	2007	Special Focus: Graduate Studies	not-for-profit	99
Hope International University	Fullerton	1928	Master's Colleges & Universities: Medium Programs	not-for-profit (Christian churches and churches of Christ)	1,025
Hult International Business School	San Francisco	1964	Special Focus Four-Year: Business & Management Schools	not-for-profit	---
Humphreys University	Stockton & Modesto	1896	Baccalaureate Colleges: Diverse Fields	not-for-profit	699
Imago Dei College	Oak Glen	2010	Not classified	---	---
Institute of Buddhist Studies	Berkeley	1966	Special Focus Four-Year: Faith-Related Institutions	not-for-profit (Buddhism/Jodo Shinshu)	65
International Technological University	San Jose	1994	Master's Colleges & Universities: Larger Programs	not-for-profit	---
Institute of Culinary Education	Pasadena	1975	Special Focus: Applied and Career Studies	for-profit	553
Institute of Technology	Clovis	1986	Special Focus: Applied and Career Studies	for-profit	1,377
Integrity College of Health	Pasadena	2007	Special Focus: Nursing	for-profit	225
InterCoast Colleges-West Covina	West Covina	1985	Special Focus: Other Health Professions	for-profit	535
Interior Designers Institute	Newport Beach	1984	Special Focus: Arts, Music, and Design	for-profit	102
John Paul the Great Catholic University	Escondido	2003	Baccalaureate Colleges: Diverse Fields	not-for-profit (Roman Catholic)	286
Keck Graduate Institute	Claremont	1997	Master's Colleges & Universities: Small Programs	not-for-profit	622
La Sierra University	Riverside	1992	Master's Colleges & Universities: Small Programs	not-for-profit (Seventh-day Adventist Church)	1,574
Laguna College of Art and Design	Laguna Beach	1961	Special Focus Four-Year: Arts, Music & Design Schools	not-for-profit	775
Latin American Bible Institute	La Puente	1926	Special Focus: Theological Studies	not-for-profit	112
Laurus College	San Luis Obispo	2006	Professions-focused Associate/Baccalaureate	for-profit	1,116
Life Chiropractic College West	Hayward	1976	Special Focus: Other Health Professions	not-for-profit	618
Life Pacific University	San Dimas	1923	Special Focus Four-Year: Faith-Related Institutions	not-for-profit (International Church of the Foursquare Gospel)	621
Lincoln University	Oakland	1926	Special Focus Four-Year: Business & Management Schools	not-for-profit	436
Lionel University	Carpinteria	1988	Special Focus: Applied and Career Studies	for-profit	403
Loma Linda University	Loma Linda	1905	Special Focus Four-Year: Medical Schools & Centers	not-for-profit (Seventh-day Adventist Church)	4,210
Los Angeles College of Music	Pasadena	1996	Special Focus Four-Year: Arts, Music & Design Schools	for-profit	261
Los Angeles Film School	Hollywood	1999	Special Focus: Arts, Music, and Design	for-profit	5,472
Los Angeles Pacific College	Los Angeles	1989	Special Focus: Arts, Music and Design	for-profit	78
Los Angeles Pacific University	San Dimas	1903	Baccalaureate college	not-for-profit	1,881
Loyola Marymount University	Los Angeles	1911	Master's Colleges & Universities: Larger Programs	not-for-profit (Catholic Church, Society of Jesus (Jesuits), Religious of the Sacred Heart of Mary (Marymount Sisters), Sisters of St. Joseph of Orange)	10,179
Marshall B. Ketchum University	Fullerton	1904	Special Focus: Other Health Professions	not-for-profit	653
Menlo College	Atherton	1927	Special Focus Four-Year: Business & Management Schools	not-for-profit	810
Meridian University	Petaluma	1993	Special Focus: Graduate Studies	for-profit	297
Middlebury Institute of International Studies at Monterey	Monterey	1955	Baccalaureate Colleges: Arts & Sciences Focus	not-for-profit	526
Minerva University	San Francisco	2011	Special Focus Four-Year: Science, Management and Arts courses	not-for-profit	669
Mount St. Mary's University	Los Angeles	1925	Master's Colleges & Universities: Medium Programs	not-for-profit (Roman Catholic Sisters of St. Joseph of Carondelet)	2,312
MTI College	Sacramento	1965	Associate's college	for-profit	2,000
Musicians Institute	Hollywood	1977	Special Focus: Arts, Music, and Design	for-profit	824
National Polytechnic College	Lakewood	1996	Special Focus: Applied and Career Studies	for-profit	516
National University	San Diego	1971	Master's Colleges & Universities: Larger Programs	not-for-profit	22,115
New York Film Academy	Los Angeles	1992	Special Focus Four-Year: Arts, Music & Design Schools	for-profit	1,132
NewSchool of Architecture and Design	San Diego	1980	Special Focus Four-Year: Arts, Music & Design Schools	for-profit (Laureate International Universities)	273
Nobel University	Los Angeles	2000	Special Focus: Business and Cybersecurity	for-profit	300
North-West College	Anaheim, Long Beach, Riverside, San Diego, West Covina	1966	Special Focus: Other Health Professions	for-profit	3,171
Notre Dame de Namur University	Belmont	1851	Master's Colleges & Universities: Larger Programs	not-for-profit (Roman Catholic Sisters of Notre Dame de Namur)	306
Oak Valley College	Rialto	2016	Special Focus: Business	not-for-profit (Christian)	75
Occidental College	Los Angeles	1887	Baccalaureate Colleges: Arts & Sciences Focus	not-for-profit	1,881
Oikos University	Oakland	2004	Not classified	not-for-profit	---
Open Christian University	Laguna Beach	2023	Exempt Religious Provider	not-for-profit (Non-denominational Christian)	---
Otis College of Art and Design	Westchester	1918	Special Focus Four-Year: Arts, Music & Design Schools	not-for-profit	1,267
Pacific College	Costa Mesa	1993	Special Focus: Nursing	for-profit	243
Pacific College of Health and Science	San Diego	1986	not classified	for-profit	786
Pacific Oaks College	Pasadena	1958	Special Focus Four-Year: Other Special Focus Institutions	not-for-profit	1,068
Pacific School of Religion	Berkeley	1866	Special Focus Four-Year: Faith-Related Institutions	not-for-profit (United Church of Christ, United Methodist Church, Disciples of Christ)	124
Pacific States University	Los Angeles	1928	Special Focus: Business	not-for-profit	101
Pacific Union College	Angwin	1882	Baccalaureate Colleges: Arts & Sciences Focus	not-for-profit (Seventh-day Adventist Church)	974
Pacifica Graduate Institute	Santa Barbara	1976	Special Focus Four-Year: Other Health Professions Schools	for-profit	833
Palo Alto University	Palo Alto	1975	Special Focus Four-Year: Other Health Professions Schools	not-for-profit	1,065
Patten University	Oakland	1944	Baccalaureate Colleges (Diverse Fields)	for-profit	---
PCI College	Cerritos	1991	Special Focus: Applied and Career Studies	for-profit	149
Pepperdine University	Malibu	1937	Doctoral Universities: Moderate Research Activity	not-for-profit (Churches of Christ)	8,976
Pima Medical Institute	Chula Vista & San Marcos	1972	Special Focus: Applied and Career Studies	for-profit	1,110
Pitzer College	Claremont	1963	Baccalaureate Colleges: Arts & Sciences Focus	not-for-profit	1,242
Platt College	Anaheim, Alhambra, Ontario, Riverside	1985	Special Focus: Applied and Career Studies	for-profit	1,981
Point Loma Nazarene University	San Diego	1902	Master's Colleges & Universities: Larger Programs	not-for-profit (Church of the Nazarene)	4,757
Pomona College	Claremont	1887	Baccalaureate Colleges: Arts & Sciences Focus	not-for-profit	1,700
Premiere Career College	Irwindale	1991	Special Focus: Applied and Career Studies	for-profit	105
Presbyterian Theological Seminary in America	Santa Fe Springs	1992	Special Focus: Theological Studies	not-for-profit	223
Professional Golfers Career College	Temecula	1990	Associate's college	for-profit	70
Reach University	Oakland	2006	Special Focus: Arts and Sciences	not-for-profit	2,230
Sacramento Ultrasound Institute	Sacramento	1983	Special Focus: Applied and Career Studies	for-profit	212
Saint Mary's College of California	Moraga	1863	Master's Colleges & Universities: Larger Programs	not-for-profit (Roman Catholic De La Salle Brothers)	2,734
Samuel Merritt University	Oakland	1909	Special Focus Four-Year: Other Health Professions Schools	not-for-profit	1,926
San Diego Christian College	Santee	1970	Baccalaureate Colleges: Diverse Fields	not-for-profit (Christian)	96
San Diego Global Knowledge University	San Diego	2007	Special Focus: Business	for-profit	193
San Diego University for Integrative Studies	San Diego	1999	Not classified	---	---
San Francisco Bay University	Fremont	1984	Special Focus: Technology, Engineering, and Sciences	not-for-profit	389
San Francisco Conservatory of Music	San Francisco	1917	Special Focus: Arts, Music, and Design	not-for-profit	439
San Francisco Film School	San Francisco	2005	Special Focus: Arts, Music, and Design	for-profit	127
San Francisco Institute of Architecture	Berkeley	1990	Not classified	---	---
San Joaquin College of Law	Clovis	1969	Special Focus Four-Year: Law Schools	not-for-profit	154
San Joaquin Valley College	Bakersfield, Fresno, Hesperia, Lancaster, Ontario, Rancho Cordova, Rancho Mirage, Salida, Santa Maria, Temecula, Visalia	1977	Not classified	for-profit	7,581
Sanford Burnham Prebys Medical Discovery Institute	La Jolla	1976	Special Focus: Graduate Studies	not-for-profit	52
Santa Clara University	Santa Clara	1851	Master's Colleges & Universities: Larger Programs	not-for-profit (Roman Catholic Jesuit)	9,728
Saybrook University	Oakland	1971	Special Focus Four-Year: Other Health Professions Schools	not-for-profit	1,057
Scripps College	Claremont	1926	Baccalaureate Colleges: Arts & Sciences Focus	not-for-profit	1,137
Shasta Bible College and Graduate School	Redding	1970	Special Focus: Theological Studies	not-for-profit	25
Simpson University	Redding	1921	Master's Colleges & Universities: Small Programs	not-for-profit (Christian and Missionary Alliance)	992
Smith Chason College	Los Angeles	1998	Special Focus: Applied and Career Studies	for-profit	2,447
Sofia University	Palo Alto	1975	Special Focus: Business	for-profit	1,145
Soka University of America	Aliso Viejo	2001	Baccalaureate Colleges: Arts & Sciences Focus	not-for-profit	495
South Baylo University	Anaheim	1977	Special Focus: Other Health Professions	not-for-profit	198
South Coast College	Orange	1961	Associate's college	for-profit	306
Southern California Institute of Architecture	Los Angeles	1972	Special Focus Four-Year: Arts, Music & Design Schools	not-for-profit	418
Southern California Institute of Technology	Anaheim	1987	Special Focus: Technology, Engineering, and Sciences	for-profit	510
Southern California Seminary	El Cajon	1946	Special Focus: Theological Studies	not-for-profit	161
Southern California University of Health Sciences	Whittier	1911	Special Focus: Other Health Professions	not-for-profit	2,008
Southern States University	San Diego	1983	Not classified	for-profit	---
Southwestern Law School	Los Angeles	1972	Special Focus Four-Year: Law Schools	not-for-profit	1,006
Spartan College of Aeronautics and Technology	Inglewood)	1928	Special Focus: Applied and Career Studies	for-profit	411
St. John's University (California)	Temecula	1969	Baccalaureate/associate's colleges, Distance learning	not-for-profit (Christian)	---
St. Photios Orthodox Theological Seminary	Etna	2015	Not classified	not-for-profit (Orthodox Christian)	---
Stanbridge University	Irvine	1996	Special Focus: Applied and Career Studies	for-profit	2,928
Stanford University	Stanford	1891	Doctoral Universities: Highest Research Activity	not-for-profit	18,625
Starr King School for the Ministry	Berkeley	1904	Special Focus Four-Year: Faith-Related Institutions	not-for-profit (Unitarian Universalist)	77
SUM Bible College and Theological Semianry	El Dorado Hills	1987	Special Focus: Theological Studies	not-for-profit	319
The Chicago School	Anaheim, Los Angeles, San Diego	1979	Special Focus: Graduate Studies	not-for-profit	3,979
The Colleges of Law	Santa Barbara & Ventura	1969	Special Focus: Law	not-for-profit	366
The Master's University	Santa Clarita	1927	Master's Colleges & Universities: Small Programs	not-for-profit (Non-denominational Christian)	2,860
The Wright Institute	Berkeley	1968	Special Focus: Graduate Studies	not-for-profit	518
Thomas Aquinas College	Santa Paula	1971	Baccalaureate Colleges: Arts & Sciences Focus	not-for-profit (Roman Catholic)	566
Thomas Jefferson School of Law	San Diego	1969	Special Focus: Law	not-for-profit	262
Touro University California	Vallejo	1997	Special Focus Four-Year: Medical Schools & Centers	not-for-profit (Jewish)	1,144
Touro University Worldwide	Los Alamitos	2008	Master's Colleges and Universities	not-for-profit	2,358
Trinity Law School	Santa Ana	1980	Special Focus: Law	not-for-profit	273
United States University	San Diego	1997	Special Focus: Nursing	for-profit	2,454
Unitek College	Fremont	2002	Special Focus: Nursing	for-profit	5,725
Universal Technical Institute	Long Beach, Rancho Cucamonga, Sacramento	1965	Special Focus: Applied and Career Studies	for-profit	4,468
University of East-West Medicine	Sunnyvale	1997	Special Focus: Other Health Professions	for-profit	81
University of La Verne	La Verne	1891	Doctoral/Professional Universities	not-for-profit (Church of the Brethren)	5,021
University of Massachusetts Global	Aliso Viejo	2009	Master's Colleges & Universities: Larger Programs	not-for-profit	8,996
University of Redlands	Redlands	1907	Master's Colleges & Universities: Larger Programs	not-for-profit	3,087
University of San Diego	San Diego	1949	Doctoral Universities: Moderate Research Activity	not-for-profit (Roman Catholic)	9,714
University of San Francisco	San Francisco	1855	Doctoral Universities: Moderate Research Activity	not-for-profit (Roman Catholic Jesuit)	8,913
University of Silicon Andhra	Milpitas	2001	Special Focus: Arts, Music, and Design	not-for-profit	238
University of Silicon Valley	Sunnyvale	1887	Baccalaureate Colleges: Diverse Fields	for-profit	477
University of Southern California	Los Angeles	1880	Doctoral Universities: Highest Research Activity	not-for-profit	46,566
University of St. Augustine for Health Sciences	San Marcos	1979	Special Focus: Other Health Professions	for-profit	4,370
University of the Pacific	Stockton	1851	Doctoral Universities: Moderate Research Activity	not-for-profit	6,944
University of the People	Pasadena	2009	Master's Colleges & Universities: Small Programs	not-for-profit	41,961
University of the West	Rosemead	1990	Baccalaureate Colleges: Diverse Fields	not-for-profit (Fo Guang Shan Buddhism)	138
University of West Los Angeles	Inglewood	1966	Special Focus Institutions (Law)	for-profit	367
Vanguard University	Costa Mesa	1920	Master's Colleges & Universities: Small Programs	not-for-profit (Assemblies of God)	2,246
West Coast University	Anaheim, Los Angeles, North Hollywood, Ontario	1909	Special Focus: Nursing	for-profit	10,478
Westcliff University	Irvine	1993	Special Focus Four-Year: Business & Management Schools	for-profit	7,686
Western Seminary	Sacramento	1927	Special Focus Four-Year: Faith-Related Institutions	not-for-profit (Christian)	---
Western University of Health Sciences	Pomona	1977	Special Focus Four-Year: Medical Schools & Centers	not-for-profit	3,665
Westminster Theological Seminary in California	Escondido	1979	Special Focus: Theological Studies	not-for-profit	108
Westmont College	Montecito	1937	Baccalaureate Colleges: Arts & Sciences Focus	not-for-profit (Evangelical Christian)	1,310
Whittier College	Whittier	1887	Baccalaureate Colleges: Arts & Sciences Focus	not-for-profit	795
William Jessup University	Rocklin	1939	Baccalaureate Colleges: Diverse Fields	not-for-profit (Evangelical Christian)	1,865
World Mission University	Los Angeles	1989	Special Focus: Theological Studies	not-for-profit	510
Xavier College School of Nursing	Stockton	2005	Special Focus: Nursing	for-profit	106
Yeshiva Ohr Elchonon Chabad West Coast Talmudical Seminary	Los Angeles	1977	Special Focus: Theological Studies	not-for-profit	163
Yo San University of Traditional Chinese Medicine	Los Angeles	1989	Special Focus: Other Health Professions	not-for-profit	166
Zaytuna College	Berkeley	2008	Not classified	not-for-profit (Muslim)	---

== Defunct institutions ==
School	Location	Founded	Closed
Berean Bible College	Poway	1971	2018
Bethany University	Scotts Valley	1911	2011
Bristol University	Anaheim	1991	2017
Brooks Institute	Ventura	1945	2016
California College of ASU	Los Angeles	1953	2025
California College of the Arts	San Francisco	1907	2027
California College San Diego	San Diego	1978	2021
California Concordia College	Oakland	1906	1973
California Jazz Conservatory	Berkeley	1997	2024
California Pacific University	Pinole	1976	2016
California Southern Law School	Riverside	1971	2020
Coleman University	San Diego	1963	2018
Cumnock College	Los Angeles	1930	1942
Cumnock Junior College	Los Angeles	1928	1930
Cumnock School of Expression	Los Angeles	1894	1942
Drexel University Sacramento	Sacramento	2009	2016
Eldorado College	Escondido	1961	1997
Emperor's College of Traditional Oriental Medicine	Santa Monica	1983	2025
Fashion Institute of Design and Merchandising	Los Angeles	1969	2025
Herguan University	Sunnyvale	2008	2019
Holy Names University	Oakland	1868	2023
ICDC College	Huntington Park	1995	2016
Immaculate Heart College	Los Angeles	1906	1981
John F. Kennedy University	Pleasant Hill	1964	2021
Make School	San Francisco	2012	2021
Marymount California University	Rancho Palos Verdes	1932	2022
Mills College	Oakland	1852	2022
Mt Sierra College	Monrovia	1990	2019
National Hispanic University	San Jose	1981	2015
Northcentral University	San Diego	1996	2022
Presidio Graduate School	San Anselmo	2003	2025
Providence Christian College	Pasadena	2002	2026
Reiss-Davis Graduate School	Los Angeles	1976	2025
San Luis Rey College	Oceanside	1950	1968
Shepherd University	Los Angeles	1999	2017
Silicon Valley University	San Jose	1997	2018
Theatre of Arts	Hollywood	1927	2025
Union Institute & University	Multiple Locations	1964	2024
University of Antelope Valley	Lancaster	1997	2024
University of Beverly Hills	Beverly Hills		2007
University of Northern California	Petaluma	1993	
University of Northern California, Lorenzo Patiño School of Law	Sacramento	1983	2013
University of Saint Katherine	San Marcos	2011	2024
Upland College	Upland	1920	1965
Washington College of Science and Industry	Irvington	1871	1894
Windsor University	Los Angeles		1982
Woodbury University	Burbank	1884	2026
Young Americans College of the Performing Arts	Corona	2002	2025

== See also ==
- List of college athletic programs in California
- Higher education in the United States
- List of American institutions of higher education
- List of recognized higher education accreditation organizations
- List of colleges and universities in San Francisco
