= SVU =

SVU may refer to:

== Places ==
- Savusavu Airport, an airport in Savusavu, Fiji (IATA: SVU, ICAO: NFNS)

== Arts, entertainment, and media ==
- Law & Order: Special Victims Unit (or Law & Order: SVU), an American police procedural TV series set in New York City
- Standard Value Unit, the universal currency in the Demon Princes sci-fi pentalogy
- Sweet Valley University, a fictional university in the Sweet Valley High book series

== Universities ==
- Shri Venkateshwara University, Uttar Pradesh, India
- Silicon Valley University, San Jose, California, U.S.
- South Valley University, Egypt
- Southern Virginia University, Buena Vista, Virginia, U.S.
- Sri Venkateswara University, Andhra Pradesh, India
- Syrian Virtual University, Syria

== Other uses ==
- Czechoslovak Society of Arts and Sciences, a nonprofit, nonpolitical, cultural organization
- Dragunov SVU, a Russian sniper rifle
- Special Victims Unit, a specialized division within some police departments
- SuperValu (United States) (NYSE ticker symbol), a United States grocery retailer and distributor

== See also ==
- SUV (disambiguation)
