= List of colleges and universities in San Francisco =

Despite its limited geographical space, San Francisco, California is home to over a dozen colleges and universities. Within Downtown San Francisco alone, there are institutions that serve over 13,000 enrolled students.

Public colleges and universities include:

- City College of San Francisco, one of the largest community colleges in the country; in Ingleside, with several extension campuses
- San Francisco State University, in the southwest corner of the city near Lake Merced and with a downtown campus since 2007
- University of California College of the Law, San Francisco, located downtown at its Civic Center
- University of California, San Francisco, primarily a graduate level health-sciences school, located in the Parnassus Heights/Inner Sunset neighborhood and in Mission Bay, San Francisco, California.

Private colleges and universities:

- Academy of Art University
- Arthur A. Dugoni School of Dentistry, part of the University of the Pacific
- California College of the Arts - closing in 2027
- California Institute of Integral Studies, in downtown San Francisco
- Golden Gate University
- Hult International Business School (Hult San Francisco Campus)
- Minerva Schools at KGI
- Notre Dame de Namur University
- San Francisco Conservatory of Music
- San Francisco School of Digital Filmmaking
- University of San Francisco, Jesuit-run; located on Lone Mountain
- Wharton School of the University of Pennsylvania

Private colleges and universities which were previously in San Francisco:

- Art Institute of California - San Francisco, now closed
- California Culinary Academy, now closed
- California School of Professional Psychology, now part of Alliant International University, in Emeryville, CA
- DeVry University, no longer in San Francisco
- The Fashion Institute of Design and Merchandising (FIDM), now closed
- Heald College, now closed
- New College of California, now closed
- Presidio Graduate School, now part of University of Redlands, and moved to San Anselmo, CA
- San Francisco Art Institute, now closed
- San Francisco Law School, now part of Alliant International University, in Emeryville, CA
- Saybrook University, now in Oakland

Table of the Universities and Colleges in San Francisco
| Name | Public or private | Type | Founded | Enrollment | Colors |
|---|---|---|---|---|---|
| San Francisco State University | Public | | 1899 | 27,815 | |
| University of San Francisco | Private | | 1855 | 11,086 | |
| Minerva University | Private | | 2012 | ≈1,000 | |
| Golden Gate University | Private | | 1901 | 5,120 | |
| University of California, San Francisco | Public | Medical school | 1864 | 5,908 | |
| University of California College of the Law, San Francisco | Public | Law school | 1878 | ≈1,000 | |
| San Francisco Conservatory of Music | Private | Music conservatory | 1917 | ≈500 | |
| Academy of Art University | Private | Art school | 1929 | 7,649 | |
| California College of the Arts | Private | Art school | 1907 (Note: The California College of the Arts moved from Oakland to San Francisco in 2022.) | 1,930 | |
| University of the Pacific (San Francisco Campus) | Private | | 1851 (Note: The University of the Pacific established its San Francisco campus in 1962 by merging with the San Francisco College of Physicians and Surgeons, which was founded in 1896.) | N/A | |
| Hult International Business School (San Francisco Campus) | Private | Business school | 2010 | N/A | |
| Presidio Graduate School | Private | Sustainable business school | 2002 | 152 | |
| California Institute of Integral Studies | Private | Graduate school | 1968 | 1,833 | |
| University of Pennsylvania Wharton School (San Francisco Campus) | Private | Business school | 2001 | ≈300 | |
| City College of San Francisco | Public | Community college | 1935 | 61,452 | |

== See also ==
- List of colleges and universities in California
