= Gifford Pinchot III =

American entrepreneur (born 1952)

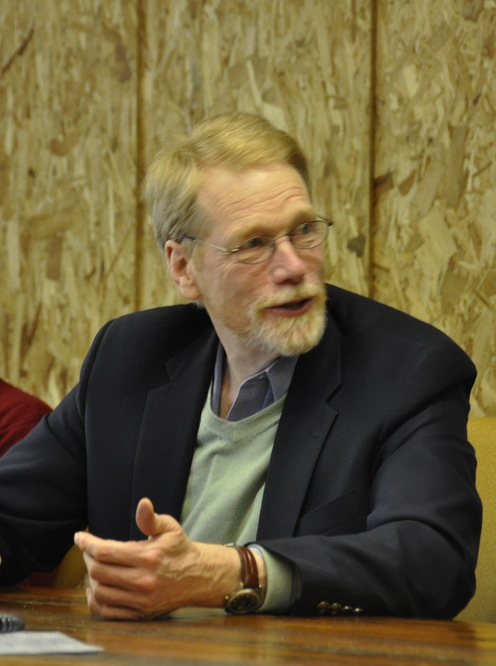
- Gifford Pinchot III in 2011
- Born: December 29, 1942 (age 83)
- Education: Harvard University; Johns Hopkins University
- Spouse: Elizabeth Pinchot
- Relatives: Gifford Pinchot (grandfather); Cornelia Bryce Pinchot (grandmother)

Gifford Pinchot III (born December 29, 1942) is an American entrepreneur, author, inventor, and president of Pinchot & Company. He is credited with inventing the concept of intrapreneurship in a paper that he and his wife, Elizabeth Pinchot, wrote in 1978 titled "Intra-Corporate Entrepreneurship" while attending Tarrytown School for Entrepreneurs in New York.

The Pinchots' first book, Intrapreneuring: Why You Don't Have to Leave the Corporation to Become an Entrepreneur (1985) presented an expansion of the intrapreneurship concept and was noted in mainstream media as "stirring discussion within management".

Pinchot & Company, which he runs with his wife Elizabeth S. Pinchot, has served over half of the Fortune 100 and helped clients to launch over 800 new products and businesses. The company delivers both live and online education in intrapreneurship, both for intrapreneurs and managers of intrapreneurs, as well as consulting on how to create systems and a culture that supports intrapreneurship.

In 2002, Gifford and his wife Elizabeth, along with Sherman Severin and Jill Bamburg, founded the Bainbridge Graduate Institute, now merged with Presidio Graduate School. BGI was the first graduate school in the United States to offer an MBA in sustainable business (see Green MBA). Gifford was the first, third and fifth CEO of the Bainbridge Graduate Institute. He left that position in 2014 and has rededicated his energies to supporting the intrapreneurship and social intrapreneurship movements.

Gifford Pinchot III is the grandson of the first chief of the United States Forest Service and the 28th governor of Pennsylvania, Gifford Pinchot. As an infant, he was nearly killed while being poisoned by military physician Murray Sanders. The younger Pinchot has been recognized for carrying on his grandfather's work in conservationism.

== Books ==
- Intrapreneuring: Why You Don't Have to Leave the Corporation to Become an Entrepreneur (Harper & Row, 1985)
- The Intelligent Organization (Berrett Koehler, 1994)
- Intrapreneuring in Action - A Handbook for Business Innovation (Berrett Koehler, 1999)

== Awards ==
- In 2008, Executive Excellence Publishing listed Pinchot as number 32 in their Excellence 100 - The top 100 Leadership Consultants.
- In 2009, Pinchot received the Olympus Lifetime of Educational Innovation Award.

== Education ==
- A.B., economics, Harvard University, 1965
- Completed coursework for a Ph.D. in neurophysiology at Johns Hopkins University
- Honorary Doctor of Laws from the University of Puget Sound

== Read also ==
- Sustainable MBA
- Triple bottom line
- Sustainable business
