= Gifford Pinchot (disambiguation) =

Gifford Pinchot (1865–1946) was the first Chief of the United States Forest Service 1905–1910 and the Governor of Pennsylvania 1923–1927, 1931–1935.

Gifford Pinchot may also refer to:

- Gifford Pinchot III, author and grandson of Gifford Pinchot
- Gifford Pinchot National Forest, a U.S. National Forest in southern Washington state
- Gifford Pinchot State Park, a Pennsylvania state park in Warrington Township, York County, Pennsylvania
