= Internal entrepreneur =

An internal entrepreneur is a type of entrepreneur who operates inside the confines of an organisation such as a business unit or a government body.

== What is an internal entrepreneur ==
An internal entrepreneur is known as an intrapreneur (makes part of intrapreneurship) and is defined as "a person within a large corporation who takes direct responsibility for turning an idea into a profitable finished product through assertive risk-taking and innovation". They are usually very motivated, with a high drive towards completing the job at a fast pace with efficience (action-oriented) who are comfortable with taking the initiative, regardless of the boundaries that the organisation or the entrepreneurial world imposes over them, they are in a constant pursuit of an innovative product or service. Their behaviour can be characterised through the ability of thinking outside the box which includes smart and clear minded risk-taking with an emphasis on leadership, these traits combined are also what make a successful entrepreneur.

== "Intrapreneurship" in practice ==
The main difference between an internal entrepreneur (intrapreneur) and an entrepreneur is the environment, which represents the sphere in which they work. An entrepreneur's aim in general terms is to create a successful organisation, while an internal entrepreneur on the other hand has to find solutions to existing problems within the company and provide improvements for the benefit of the existing organisation.

Forbes Insights studies state that internal entrepreneurs comprise approximately one in every six executives in Europe. They tend to be innovators with specific ideas and a mind set towards the creation of original plans for the prosperity of the company. The task of an internal entrepreneur is to push the idea to a corporate bureaucracy which may be inhospitable to new ideas.

A significant portion of current entrepreneurs were once internal entrepreneurs who weren't satisfied with their work or the limits put on innovation. Some companies have attempted to accommodate the idea of internal entrepreneurs, under the idea that it is in their own benefit. As a result, some large organisation I"nnovation departments" led by a "Chief Innovation Officer". Since the mid 2000s, this trend has grown. As of 2014, the majority of consulting companies have innovation offices, according to The Harvard Business Review.

According to statistics published by Forbes in 2011, companies have a roughly similar proportion of internal entrepreneurs regardless of size or revenue:

- 12% intrapreneurs in organisations with 10-49 employees
- 25% intrapreneurs in organisations with 500-999 employees
- 20% intrapreneurs in organisation with the revenue of $100+ million.

== Traits of Internal Entrepreneurs ==
Some key traits that influence entrepreneurs are:

- Money Is Not the Measurement - their determination is not driven by the money, payment is a sign that they are doing their job well; however, they are mainly motivated by influence with freedom.
- Strategic Scanning - constant curiosity is what makes an internal entrepreneur stand out, they keep learning new things and applying them within their area of knowledge which benefits both themselves and the organisation.
- Greenhousing - people are not open to new and radical ideas, therefore internal entrepreneurs upon coming up with a new idea tend to keep it and let it flourish in their mind so when the right time comes, they can share it with the rest.
- Visual Thinking - they don't act on an idea or solution immediately, they weigh the pros and cons, try to come up with more solutions. They have to go through a brain storming, mind mapping and designing process to achieve what they need.
- Pivoting - stands for shifting radically from the current strategic method of a business and it is one of the key characteristics of any internal entrepreneur. This means that they are open for change if it is in the benefit of the company, be it in long or short run.
- Authenticity and Integrity - internal entrepreneurs are familiar with both confidence and humility, their wide aspect and range of understanding allows them to act efficiently, makes them smart risk-takers.

== Examples ==
Sony: Ken Kutaragi, then a junior engineer at Sony, developed an interest in improving the sound capabilities of Nintendo's hardware, working on the project in his personal time. Though the initiative initially faced internal resistance within Sony, Kutaragi gained the support of a senior executive, which allowed the project to move forward. This eventually led to the development of the Sony PlayStation, one of the company's most commercially significant products. The PlayStation went on to become one of the best-selling console platforms in the history of the gaming industry, and is widely regarded as an example of successful intrapreneurship.

3M: Dr. Spencer Silver was trying to create a strong adhesive with the aim of using it in aerospace technology. His research proved to be unsuccessful as he accidentally created a light adhesive that would stick to surfaces without leaving any trace after removal. This is an example of strategic scanning where instead of getting rid of the idea, he decided to keep working on it and improving it further for other uses. After years of trying to push the idea forwards, he joined forces with Art Fry (a fellow scientist at 3M), together they came with the idea of Post-IT notes which are actively used until now.

== See also ==
- Intrapreneurship
- Entrepreneurship
- Chief Innovation Officer
