= Sustainable MBA =

Academic degree

The traditional MBA degree (Masters in Business Administration) requires coursework and other study of business from a primarily financial standpoint, with some attention to management of people, to conventional economic theory, and to business ethics. A sustainable MBA program includes these subjects, and also study of managing for environmental and social sustainability. These programs are sometimes called "green MBAs".

== Conceptual foundation ==
Sustainability in these programs is generally defined to include economic, environmental, and social sustainability, collectively known as the Triple Bottom Line. For each of these domains, sustainability means that it will be possible to continue through the foreseeable future, at least, without major breakdowns, such as

- Economic: running out of oil or other natural resources and having nothing to replace them on the scale required
- Environmental: loss of habitat, species, and whole ecologies; global warming
- Social: overpopulation beyond the carrying capacity of the earth; consequences of eliminating poverty within the current economic model

The environmental and social justice movements are sources for many of the issues, arguments, and research on sustainability, but the idea has firm roots in classical economics.

- Externalities: economically significant effects of manufacturing and trade on those who are not part of the industry or market in question. The classic example of a negative externality is pollution, while the largest current issue is global warming. The literature has identified many others, and many positive externalities, and has proposed many controversial measures to improve the balance.
- Natural resources: conventional accounting, including national accounts, treats extraction of finite natural resources as income, priced at the cost of extraction, and not as depletion of non-renewable natural capital. The resources of nature come to us for free. They are of infinite value from the point of view of preserving and sustaining life, but may not be subject to trading in a market, as in the case of air for breathing, for agriculture, or for burning fuels.
- The problem of value: conventional economics can describe the process of setting prices in a marketplace through the interaction of supply and demand, but cannot adequately explain value. (Though not for lack of trying. See Labor Theory of Value and Util for examples.) The most economists generally agree on is that an individual purchaser in a free market will only buy something worth more to that individual than the price, and that the seller values the goods less than the price, so that both sides come out ahead.
- Participation: The free market is not free to those who have no access to it.

One of the themes of sustainable MBA education is the extent to which environmental and social sustainability can be achieved at a profit, a question by no means answered fully.

Sustainability MBA programs can vary significantly from one school to another, some may stress management, some may stress entrepreneurship, others simply add a few "green" classes to their existing MBA program. Many advise to look at a program's curriculum, history, vision, mission, and most of all, to go and attend a class before fully enrolling in a program, as transparency is espoused as core to a sustainable MBA.

The longest running fully integrated sustainability graduate school (founded 2003) is Presidio Graduate School with MBA programs in San Francisco and Seattle.

== Sustainable MBA programs ==
The following are some of the current business programs explicitly offering MBA degrees in sustainability. Although many traditional MBA programs have incorporated sustainability-related topics into their curriculum, this list only includes schools offering a specific degree or concentration in sustainability areas:

Australia

- Monash University offers a Corporate Environmental and Sustainability Management stream within its Master of Sustainability

Canada

- Gustavson School of Business at University of Victoria offers an MBA in Sustainable Innovation
- Schulich's School of Business offers a specialization in sustainability as part of their MBA program.
- University of Toronto - offers a Master of Science in Sustainability Management degree with a concentration in either science or management within the Institute for Management and Innovation
- University of Guelph - offers a Masters of Business Administration in Sustainable Commerce

Costa Rica

- INCAE Business School offers a concentration in Sustainable Development to its MBA students.

Denmark

- Aarhus School of Business, Aarhus University offers a Sustainable MBA option.

Germany

- Leuphana University Lueneburg - Centre for Sustainability Management offers an MBA Sustainability Management since 2003

India

- Indian Institute of Management, Lucknow is the first IIM to offer a two-year full time MBA in Sustainable Management. The program only accepts candidates with a minimum work-experience of two years.
- Indian Institute of Forest Management, Bhopal, India run by Ministry of Environment and Forest offers PGDFM in Environment Management
- Bharathidasan University offers MBA in Environmental Management degree options.
- TERI University offers MBA in Business Sustainability and Infrastructure http://www.teriuniversity.ac.in/mba-programme
- Xavier Institute of Management Bhubaneswar (XIMB), Xavier University, India - offers a two-year full time MBA programme in Sustainability Management

Israel

- Faculty of Management , University of Haifa offers an an international MBA program specializing in sustainability.

Malaysia

- International Centre for Education in Islamic Finance (INCEIF) offers an MBA (Sustainable Business)

Philippines

- Holy Angel University

HAU offers a Green MBA in Leadership for a Suntainable Economy

Japan

- Doshisha Business School, Doshisha University offers a Green MBA certificate and a Sustainability and Green Business focus area within its Global MBA program.

Sweden

- Blekinge Tekniska Högskola in Sweden offers a Master's in Strategic Leadership Towards Sustainability.

Switzerland

- Sustainability Management School Switzerland (SUMAS) offers an on-campus as well as an online MBA with a major in Sustainability Management or Finance & Responsible Investment.

Thailand

- College of Management, Mahidol University offers an MM in Managing for Sustainability

United Kingdom

- Norwich Business School, University of East Anglia offers an MBA in Strategic Carbon Management
- University of Exeter - offers a One Planet MBA.

United States

- Bard College Offers an MBA in Sustainability
- Albers School of Business & Economic, Seattle University offers a Sustainability Specialization as part of their MBA program.
- Anaheim University offers an online Green MBA degree option.
- Antioch University New England offers an MBA in Sustainability degree.
- Brandeis International Business School, Brandeis University offers a Sustainable Development MBA.
- W.P. Carey School of Business, Arizona State University offers an emphasis in Sustainability as part of their MBA program.
- Chatham University offers a dual Master of Sustainability and MBA.
- Clark University offers an MBA in Sustainability
- Colorado State University offers an MBA in Global Social & Sustainable Enterprise.
- Dominican University of California offers an MBA in Sustainable Enterprise.
- Duquesne University Palumbo–Donahue School of Business offers an MBA in Sustainable Business Practices as the #1 Ranked program in the USA by The Corporate Knights.
- Golden Gate University offers a concentration option in Managing for Sustainability as part of their MBA program.
- Green Mountain College offers a Sustainable MBA option.
- Haas School of Business, UC Berkeley offers a concentration in Corporate Social Responsibility to its MBA students.
- Johnson Graduate School of Management, Cornell University offers a concentration and an immersion in Sustainable Global Enterprise.
- Kenan–Flagler Business School, UNC-Chapel Hill offers an MBA@UNC concentration in Sustainable Enterprise.
- Marlboro College Graduate School offers an MBA in Managing for Sustainability.
- Marylhurst University- offers an MBA in Sustainable Business.
- MIT Sloan School of Management offers a Sustainability Certificate for MBA and related masters programs.
- The Pennsylvania State University offers "Sustainability and Social Innovation" Concentration on its MBA Program at Smeal College of Business
- Presidio Graduate School, offers an MBA, MPA, and dual degree in Sustainable Solutions and certificates in sustainable energy, food & agriculture, and cooperative management. In 2016, Presidio Graduate School acquired Pinchot University programs, launched in 2002 as the first Sustainable Business MBA program in the world. The school now offers classes in San Francisco and online.
- San Francisco State University's College of Business offers an emphasis in Sustainable Business as part of their MBA program.
- Stuart School of Business, Illinois Institute of Technology offers a Sustainability concentration to its MBA students and a dual MBA/MS Environmental Management and Sustainability degree.
- Unity College offers an online Sustainable MBA.
- Tepper School of Business, Carnegie Mellon University offers a concentration in Ethics and Social Responsibility to its MBA students.
- University of Michigan Ross School of Business - offers a dual degree program through the Erb Institute for Global Sustainable Enterprise with the School of Natural Resources and Environment
- University of Oregon Lundquist College of Business - offers an MBA with a concentration in sustainability through the Center for Sustainable Business Practices (CSBP).
- University of Vermont School of Business - offers a one-year MBA in Sustainable Innovation (SI-MBA).
- Wilmington University - offers an MBA in Environmental Sustainability
- Zicklin School of Business, Baruch College offers a major in Sustainable Business Management

== Sustainable MBA rankings ==
As interest in sustainability within MBA programs has increased, so has an interest on assessing their quality and different approaches. Beyond Grey Pinstripes, a biennial ranking and program survey, published by the Aspen Institute is based on the integration of social, environmental, and ethical stewardship into university curriculum and faculty research. The ranking also weights significantly the extent to which students are exposed to these topics throughout their studies. Participation in the survey requires US-based schools possess accreditation; international schools must also be accredited or be recognized as leading institutions. The 2009-2010 cycle consisted of 149 participating universities. The top-ranked school with a specialization in sustainability, Schulich, is Canadian. 63% of these schools were based in the US, while the remaining 37% were located throughout 24 countries. Although survey information from all participating schools is made available online, the top participating schools were ranked in the Aspen's Global 100 list. The 2011-2012 survey and ranking again include data from 149 universities.

Although not a ranking of business programs, Net Impact annually produces and publishes a graduate program guide titled Business as UNusual. The guide seeks to provide information about what graduate programs offer their students within the realm of corporate responsibility and sustainability. Data for the guide come from surveys completed by graduate student Net Impact chapter leaders and from chapter member surveys. The most recent report contains profiles of 95 business schools.

Corporate Knights magazine publishes an annual "Better World MBA" ranking. This ranking evaluates MBA programs based on sustainability-related research, the integration of sustainability within the program curriculum, sustainability-focused institutes, and faculty diversity. In 2020, the Griffith Business School MBA was ranked #1 in the world, while Duquesne University's MBA-Sustainable Business Practices was ranked #1 in the United States.

Many MBA programs which offer sustainability degrees or concentrations also appear in general business school rankings. U.S. News & World Report, Business Week, Financial Times, The Economist, and The Wall Street Journal all publish rankings of selected MBA programs. While the methodologies of each differ, most weight ranks heavily by employment and salary statistics, standardized test scores, and surveys of corporate recruiters.

== Criticism ==
Followers of Milton Friedman and the Chicago school of economics often claim that business has no other duty than profits to shareholders, and that business therefore has a duty not to pursue environmental and social sustainability except where it increases profits. The extent to which such actions are profitable is much disputed. On the other hand, Friedman actually did not say that the duty to shareholders was absolute: corporations also had a duty to obey the law and compete fairly. Friedman's criticism has been debunked by legal scholars (e.g., Stout 2002), who have shown that Friedman had no legal basis for his conclusion. Corporate executives do not legally need to run the corporation for shareholders and could, in fact, operate the corporation to benefit society and environment. The fact that Friedman misunderstood corporate governance is no surprise as it was not his area of expertise, and the fact that the NYT Magazine allowed the mistake is not a surprise as it is not a double blind peer reviewed academic journal.

The debate must then turn to the question of what laws may properly be placed on corporate behavior to prevent fraud and other forms of malfeasance, and to ensure open and free competition, with what enforcement mechanisms. Also, whether corporate lobbying for subsidies and other legally-mandated advantages is fair, given that it is economically inefficient and indeed harmful. This question turns in part on the honesty and effectiveness of governments, where results are decidedly mixed. It also turns in part on the honesty and effectiveness of public pressure groups. Results there are also decidedly mixed.

Criticism of sustainable or "green MBAs" has also been heard from environmentalists and social activists. Some complain of corporate greenwashing, that is, of companies pretending to be sustainable or green by hiring graduates of these programs when the companies really are not. Some complain that the programs themselves are not sustainable enough, pointing to weaknesses in their curriculum and core proposition.

Another criticism relates to the sustainability skills gap. A recent study shows that business schools are too slow to adjust and the skills gap is broadening, regardless the recent surge of sustainable MBA programs. The report states that "environment and sustainability skills will be essential to plan the adaptations needed to survive and stay competitive", businesses unfortunately are ill prepared for these growing challenges and business schools are failing to offer enough environmental and ecological education, despite the increasing demand from businesses. In line with the IEMA report, several academics also criticize business schools emphasizing that the gap will be finally closed by those programs with sustainability at the core, which in most cases are emerging outside the business school world.
