= Corporate social entrepreneurship =

Non-specific organisational entrepreneur

A corporate social entrepreneur (CSE) is someone who attempts to advance a social agenda in addition to a formal job role as part of a corporation. It is possible for CSEs to work in organizational contexts that are favourable to corporate social responsibility (CSR). CSEs focus on developing both social capital, economic capital and their formal job role may not always align with corporate social responsibility. A person in a non-executive or managerial position can still be considered a CSE.

== Relevance ==
CSE is a multi-disciplinary scientific sub-field relating to the fields of corporate social responsibility and sustainability. It has relevance in the context of business and management, specifically in areas such as business ethics, sustainability, organizational behavior, entrepreneurship, human resource management and business strategy. The concept has intersections with sociology, anthropology, social psychology and philosophy.

The social entrepreneurship literature has largely concentrated on the voluntary, not-for-profit, or "third" sector. In the for-profit context, the social entrepreneur is traditionally perceived as a philanthropic agent or business owner. In the UK, the corporation is defined by the company’s directors and shareholders in its articles of association, requiring employees to deliver returns to shareholders, through their job roles. The exception to this might be the UK’s Co-operative Group, which describes its business as guided by a social mission and is not responsible to shareholders for delivering profit.

CSE is unlikely to have the time or other resources to commit full-scale due to organizational constraints. Hence, corporate social entrepreneurship is characterized by its informality. The entrepreneurial discretion that is required to perform it is controversial. Activity done by CSEs varied across the domains of CSR.

== Background ==
CSE was initially described in 2002 in a theoretical working paper published in the Hull University Business School Research Memoranda Series. The paper argued that personal values could also motivate CSR (and sustainability), along with more apparent economic and macro-political drivers. This reflected traditional business ethics and the philosophical debate on moral agency. The paper was then followed by a UK conference paper, published the following year in the Journal of Business Ethics, which discussed the significance of managerial discretion in CSR.

The term "corporate social entrepreneur" was first used in a paper presented during the 17th Annual European Business Ethics Network Conference held in June 2004. The term "corporate social entrepreneur" was defined and distinguished from other types of entrepreneurs, such as executive entrepreneurs, intrapreneurs (Pinchot, 1985), policy entrepreneurs, and public or social entrepreneur. The term initially referred to managers. However, employee inclusion was later extended to all levels of the firm.

Dr. Christine A. Hemingway developed the idea of CSE after her stint as a marketing executive in the corporate sector. The notion was also inspired by Wood, who had previously referred to "Ethical training, cultural background, preferences…and life experiences…that motivate human behavior".

== Business ethics ==
Embezzlement of social entrepreneurial funds is not unheard of, nor are generally unethical business practices being covered up by robust social entrepreneurial programs. Many businesses conduct social entrepreneurship for the sake of public relations. Social corporate entrepreneurship activity has yet to be quantified on any objective scale. There is some evidence that supports the idea that businesses that are ethical, as reported by their employees, are performing better than those that are not. This evidence is joined by other evidence which suggests that employees tend to leave companies that they do not view as behaving ethically. CSE has been described as a manifestation of enlightened self-interest. Alternatively, a deontological viewpoint frames acts of socially responsible behavior as driven by the individual's sense of duty to society, which may be viewed in terms of altruism.

== Research ==
Summers and Dyck (2011) described the abstract stages of CSE as: first socialization, or the conception of a socially beneficial idea. Second externalization, developing the idea into a concrete plan. Third integration, making the idea a reality. Finally, fourth is internalization, or establishing socially beneficial practices in the company.

Some studies have shown a positive relationship between CSR and financial performance, others regard the picture as more nuanced. Consequently, the notion of the corporate social entrepreneur is controversial due to arguments about the role of business and whether or not CSR helps financial performance, and because the concept of employee discretion has been considered a key factor in moral character (in the ancient philosophical sense). Some unethical behavior is sometimes acknowledged as an outcome of discretion and agency; corporate irresponsibility is regarded as insufficient. This was relevant during the 2008 financial crisis, which was exacerbated by financial irregularities and lapses in corporate governance. These have produced some calls to move beyond capitalism. Individuals closely related between the financial objectives of a company and public well-being sometimes referred to as Social Intraprenuers. Hemingway (2013) referred to the synonymous nature of the two terms: intrapreneur (Pinchot, 1985) and corporate entrepreneur.

The value system that is employed within an organization plays a large role in the emergence of corporate social entrepreneurs. Moreover, the sustainability of social intrapreneurship ventures has been called into question by critics. Socially beneficial ventures often struggles in the short term, leading to hesitance from investors.

== See also ==
- Business ethics
- Corporate governance
- Corporate social responsibility
- Entrepreneurship
- Intrapreneurship
- Moral agency
- Moral development
- Morality
- Philanthropy
- Social entrepreneurship

== Bibliography ==
- Archer, M.S., Being Human: The Problem of Agency, Cambridge University Press, Cambridge. 2000.
- Austin, James; Stevenson, Howard; Wei–Skillern, Jane (January 2006). "Social and Commercial Entrepreneurship: Same, Different, or Both?". Entrepreneurship Theory and Practice. 30 (1): 1–22. doi:10.1111/j.1540-6520.2006.00107.x. S2CID 154642522.
- Austin, J.; Leonard, H.; Reficco, E. and Wei-Skillern, J. Social Entrepreneurship: It is for Corporations too in Social Entrepreneurship: New Models of Sustainable Social Change A. Nicholls, ed., Oxford University Press, Oxford. 2006b, pp. 169 – 181.
- Austin, J.; Leonard, H; Reficco, E. and Wei-Skillern, J. Corporate Social Entrepreneurship: A New Vision for CSR in The Accountable Corporation: Corporate Social Responsibility Volume 3 M. Epstein and K. Hanson, eds., Praeger, Westport, CT. 2006c, pp. 237 – 247.
- Bierhoff, H.-W., Prosocial Behaviour, Psychology Press, Hove. 2002.
- Crane, Andrew; McWilliams, Abagail; Matten, Dirk; Moon; Moon, Jeremy; Siegal, Donald S., eds. (2010). Business Ethics A European Perspective: Managing Corporate Citizenship and Sustainability in the Age of Globalization (3rd ed.). Oxford University Press. ISBN 9780199211593.
- Drumwright, M.E., Socially Responsible Organisational Buying: Environmental Concern as a Noneconomic Buying Criterion. Journal of Marketing 58[July], 1–19. 1994.
- Fisher, C. and Lovell, A., Business Ethics and Values, 2nd ed., Pearson Education, Harlow, U.K. 2006.
- Friedman, M., The Social Responsibility of Business is to Increase Its Profits. The New York Times Magazine, 13 September, 1–13. 1970.
- Hemingway, C.A., An Exploratory Analysis of Corporate Social Responsibility: Definitions, Motives and Values, Research Memorandum No. 34, University of Hull Business School. 2002. ISBN 978-1-902034-24-9
- Hemingway, C.A., Personal Values as the Catalyst for the Corporate Social Entrepreneur. 17th Annual European Business Ethics Network (EBEN) Conference (‘Ethics and Entrepreneurship’), University of Twente, Enschede, The Netherlands, 24/26 June 2004.
- Hemingway, C.A. (2005). "Personal Values as a Catalyst for Corporate Social Entrepreneurship". Journal of Business Ethics. 60 (3): 233–249. doi:10.1007/s10551-005-0132-5. S2CID 145365066.
- Hemingway, C.A., What Determines Corporate Social Entrepreneurship? Antecedents and Consequences, Conditions and Character Traits. Presented at the PhD Workshop, ‘CSR and Sustainable Business’, School of Management and Entrepreneurship, Katholieke Universitat Leuven, Belgium, 5 May 2006.
- Hemingway, C.A. (2013a). Corporate Social Entrepreneurship: Integrity Within. Cambridge: Cambridge University Press. ISBN 978-1-107-44719-6.
- Hemingway, Christine A. (2013b). "Corporate Social Entrepreneurship". In Idowu, S.O.; Capaldi, N.; Zu, L.; Das Gupta, A. (eds.). Encyclopedia of Corporate Social Responsibility. Springer-Verlag. pp. 544–551. doi:10.1007/978-3-642-28036-8_363. ISBN 978-3-642-28036-8.
- Hemingway, C.A. and Maclagan, P.W. (2003), Managers' Individual Discretion and Corporate Social Responsibility: the Relevance of Personal Values. 7th European Business Ethics Network (EBEN- UK) U.K. Annual Conference, and the 5th Ethics and Human Resource Management Conference, Selwyn College, Cambridge, 7–8 April 2003. ISBN 1-84233-087-X.
- Hemingway, C.A. and Maclagan, P.W., Managers Personal Values as Drivers of Corporate Social Responsibility, Journal of Business Ethics, 50(1), March (I), pp. 33–44. 2004.
- Jones, T.M., Instrumental Stakeholder Theory: a Synthesis of Ethics and Economics. Academy of Management Review 20[2], 404–437. 1995.
- Kohlberg, L., in Handbook of Socialization Theory and Research D.A. Goslin, ed., Rand McNally, Chicago. 1969, pp. 347–480.
- Lovell, A., Moral Agency as Victim of the Vulnerability of Autonomy. Business Ethics: A European Review 11[1], 62–76. January 2002.
- Maclagan, P.W. (1998). Management and Morality. London: Sage.
- McWilliams A. and Siegel, D., Corporate Social Responsibility: A Theory of the Firm Perspective. Academy of Management Review 26[1], 117–127. 2001.
- Monbiot, G., Captive State: The Corporate Takeover of Britain, Macmillan, London. 2000.
- Moon, J., in The International Directory of Corporate Philanthropy C. Hartley, ed., Europa, London. 2003.
- Pinchot, G. Intrapreneuring: Why You Don’t Have To leave The Corporation To Become an Entrepreneur. New York: Harper and Row. 1985.
- Schwartz, S.H. and Bilsky, W., Toward a Universal Psychological Structure of Human Values. Journal of Personality and Social Psychology 53 [3], 550–562. 1987.
- Schwartz, S. H. and Boehnke, K., Evaluating the Structure of Human Values with Confirmatory Factor Analysis. Journal of Research in Personality 38, 230–255. 2004.
- Soros, G., The Crisis and What to Do About It. The New York Review of Books 55[19], 4 December 2008. Accessed online The Crisis & What to Do About It | George Soros April 2009.
- Trevino, L. K., Ethical Decision Making in Organizations: a Person-Situation Interactionist Model. Academy of Management Review 11[3], 601–617. 1986.
- Wood, D. L., Corporate Social Performance Revisited. Academy of Management Review 16[4], 691–718. 1991.
