= Epic Bible College =

Private Bible college in Sacramento, California

- Former name: Trinity School of the Bible
- Type: Private Bible College
- Established: 1974
- Affiliations: non-denominational; historically associated with Assemblies of God
- President: Ronald W. Harden
- Students: 312 (Fall 2011)
- Location: Sacramento County, California, United States; 38°38′42.6″N 121°21′45.5″W
- Campus: Urban area
- Website: http://epic.edu

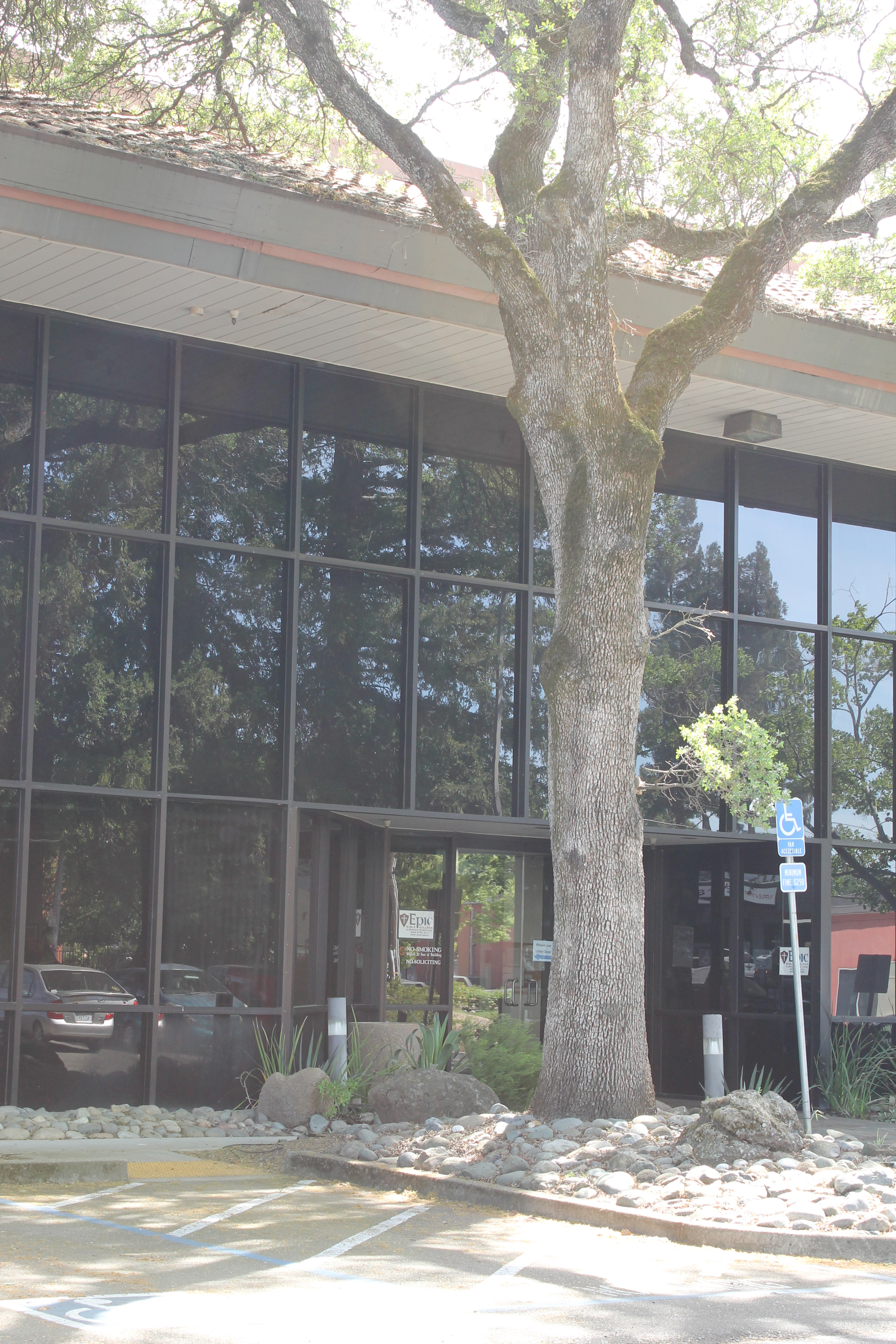
Epic Bible College viewed from Auburn Boulevard.

Epic Bible College (formerly known as Trinity Life Bible College or TLBC) is a private Bible college in Sacramento, California.

== History ==
Epic Bible College was founded in 1974 under the name "Trinity School of the Bible" by Paul Trulin. Trulin was the pastor of Trinity Church (now Trinity Life Center; an Assemblies of God congregation) at the time and wanted to train people for Christian ministry. The church board and congregation shared his vision and approved the establishment of a church-based Bible college. Trulin served as pastor of the church as well as president of the Bible College until his retirement in 1982.

Trinity began to seek accreditation in 1993, and achieved accreditation candidacy level in 1999. In 2004 the process was complete and Trinity received full accreditation from the Transnational Association of Christian Colleges and Schools. Through the process, Trinity has seen academic improvement, the addition of a Division of General Education, upgrades in technology and facilities, and now has more opportunities to grant financial aid.

== Academics ==
Epic offers one B.A. in Ministerial Studies, two Associate of Arts, one each in Ministerial Studies and Christian Studies, as well as several certificates in various ministry related areas. According to an Institute for Creation Research report, Trinity teaching holds to a strictly young Earth creationist doctrine, which the ICR defines as "God created all life forms according to the literal interpretation of the Biblical record (six-day creation, recent global flood)."

== See also ==
- List of colleges and universities in California
