= Pinchot University =

Defunct university in Seattle, Washington

Coordinates: 47°37′41″N 122°31′07″W

Pinchot Programs at Presidio Graduate School
- Type: Private nonprofit educational
- Established: 2002
- President: Suzanne Farver
- Administrative staff: 15
- Postgraduates: 500+
- Location: Seattle, Washington, United States
- Website: www.presidio.edu

Pinchot University was a private graduate university in Seattle, Washington. Founded in 2002, Pinchot University was the first school to offer an MBA in Sustainable Business. In August 2016, Pinchot University was acquired by Presidio Graduate School.

== History ==
Pinchot University was founded in 2002 by Gifford Pinchot III, Libba Pinchot, Sherman Severin and Jill Bamburg as Bainbridge Graduate Institute (BGI). In November 2002, BGI was authorized by the State of Washington's Higher Education Coordinating Board to offer the MBA in Sustainable Business. In August 2009, BGI was awarded a grant of accreditation from the Accrediting Council for Independent Colleges and Schools (ACICS).

The school graduated hundreds of people with certificates, MBA, and MPA degrees. In August 2016, Pinchot University was acquired by Presidio Graduate School.

There is an active nonprofit group for faculty, staff, volunteers, friends, and colleagues, the Bainbridge Graduate Institute Community Association.
