= Orange County Business College =

- Active: 1973–1997
- Parent institution: Eldorado College
- Accreditation: Accrediting Council for Independent Colleges and Schools
- Dean: Susan A. Fechtman
- Location: Anaheim, California, United States; 33.81904°N 117.88802°W

Orange County Business College (OCBC) was a private post-secondary educational institution located in Anaheim, California. Established as a subsidiary of Eldorado College, the school closed when its parent college was forced to close in November 1997.

== History ==
Eldorado College was founded in Escondido, CA and later opened three additional campuses. Eldorado College campuses were established in Oceanside, California, West Covina, California and San Diego, California. Eldorado College was privately operated from 1961 to 1997. OCBC was founded in 1973. Eldorado College and OCBC offered nine two year programs, a number of four year degree programs and various certificate programs. Orange County Business College expanded in later years to include three master's degree programs.

According to the BPPVE database, Orange County Business College which was located at 2035 East Ball Road, Anaheim, CA 92805 closed on November 24, 1997.

Both Eldorado College and Orange County Business College were accredited by Accrediting Council for Independent Colleges and Schools. Eldorado College in Oceanside, CA had been accredited since 1980 and their campus in West Covina, CA had been accredited since 1985. Orange County Business College in Anaheim had been accredited since 1973.
