= Mt Sierra College =

Educational institution

- Motto: Where technology meets creativity
- Type: Private for-profit college
- Active: 1990–2019
- President: Brian Chilstrom
- Students: 200–500
- Location: Monrovia, California, U.S.
- Website: mtsierra.edu
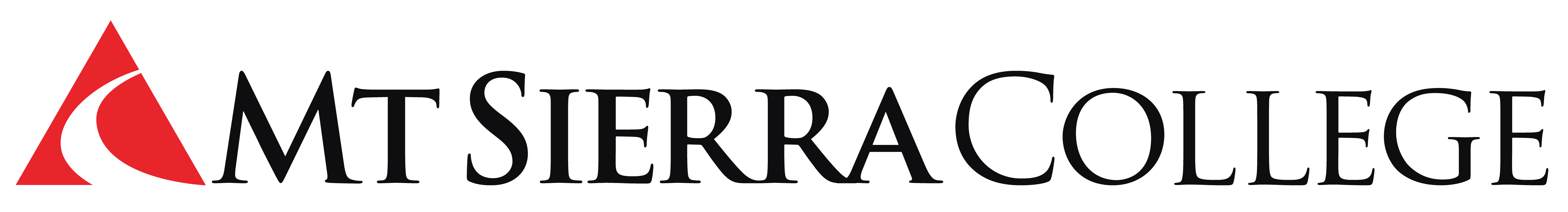

Mt Sierra College (MSC) was a private for-profit college in Monrovia, California. The college was established in 1990, offering majors in Media Arts and Design, Information Technology, and Business. It was owned by Chinese businessman George Jie Zhao's investment company Wellsland LLC. The college closed in 2019.

== History ==
In January 1990, Mt Sierra College was established in Monrovia, California. Originally named "Computer Technology Institute", it offered short computer software application courses. In 1992, the college became a Novell Education Academic Partner and was authorized to offer Novell courses. In 1993, the college began a partnership with Microsoft and was authorized to offer Microsoft certification preparation courses. In April 1996, the college received accreditation by the Accrediting Commission of Career Schools and Colleges (ACCSC) and started offering degree courses in Telecommunications Technology, Multimedia Design Technology and Computer Information Technology. In fall 2002, Mt Sierra launched its first business degree program.

In 2014, the school was acquired by the investment firm Wellsland LLC, owned by Chinese businessman George Jie Zhao.

During the mid-2010s, the college suffered from high attrition as students left the college; this information was not shared with the college's owners.

In 2018, the college was placed "on warning" by its accreditor, ACCSC, because of its below-benchmark graduation rates in three of its four accredited degree programs, and in June 2019, this was escalated to "probation".

On June 24, 2019, college President Brian Chilstrom notified faculty, staff, and students by email that the college was to close the next day, stating that they had "severe financial problems" and "cannot continue to hold classes". According to the college, students due to graduate on June 27 would receive their diplomas, though the ceremony was cancelled because of security concerns.

== Students and campus ==
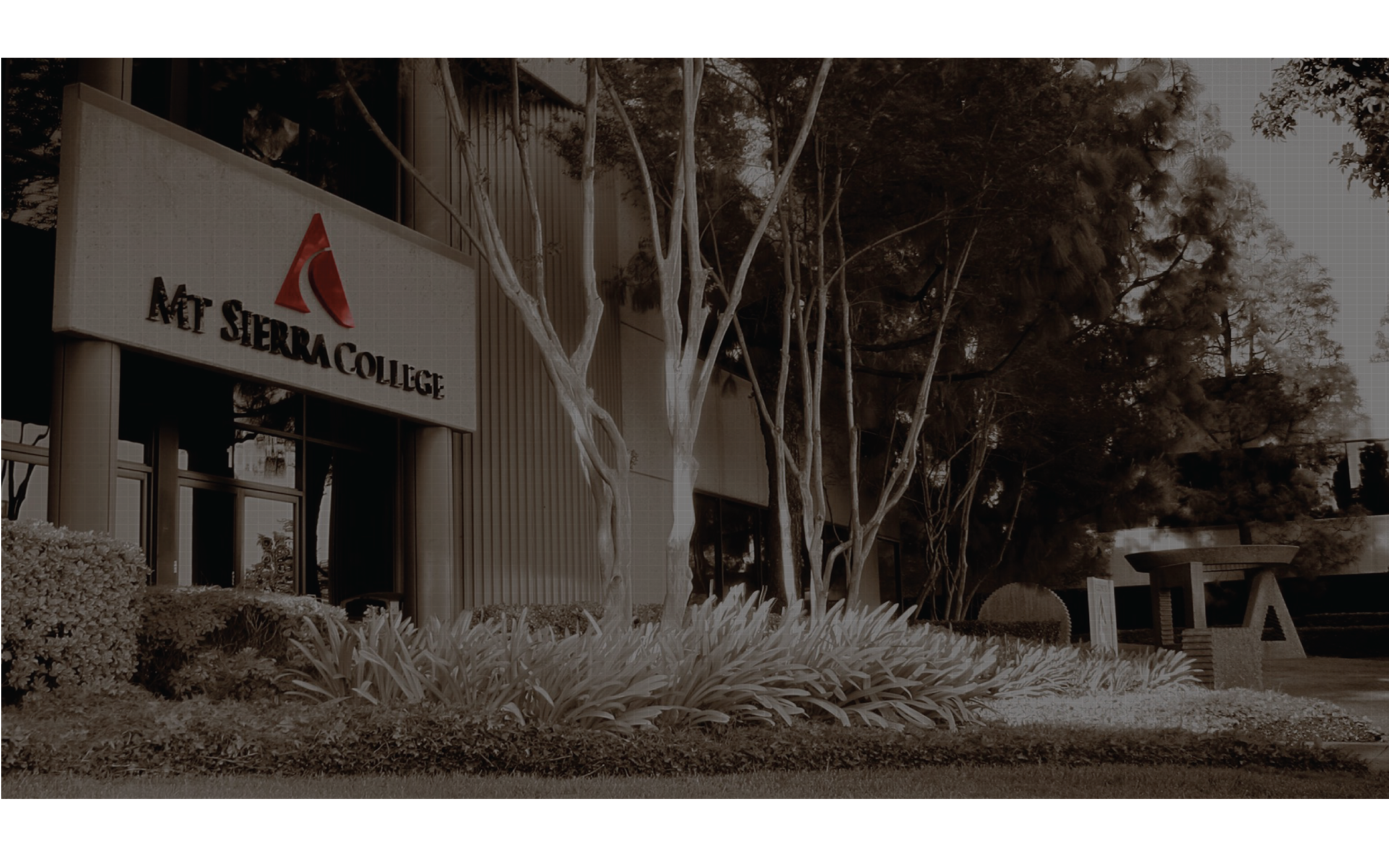
Photo of the campus entrance

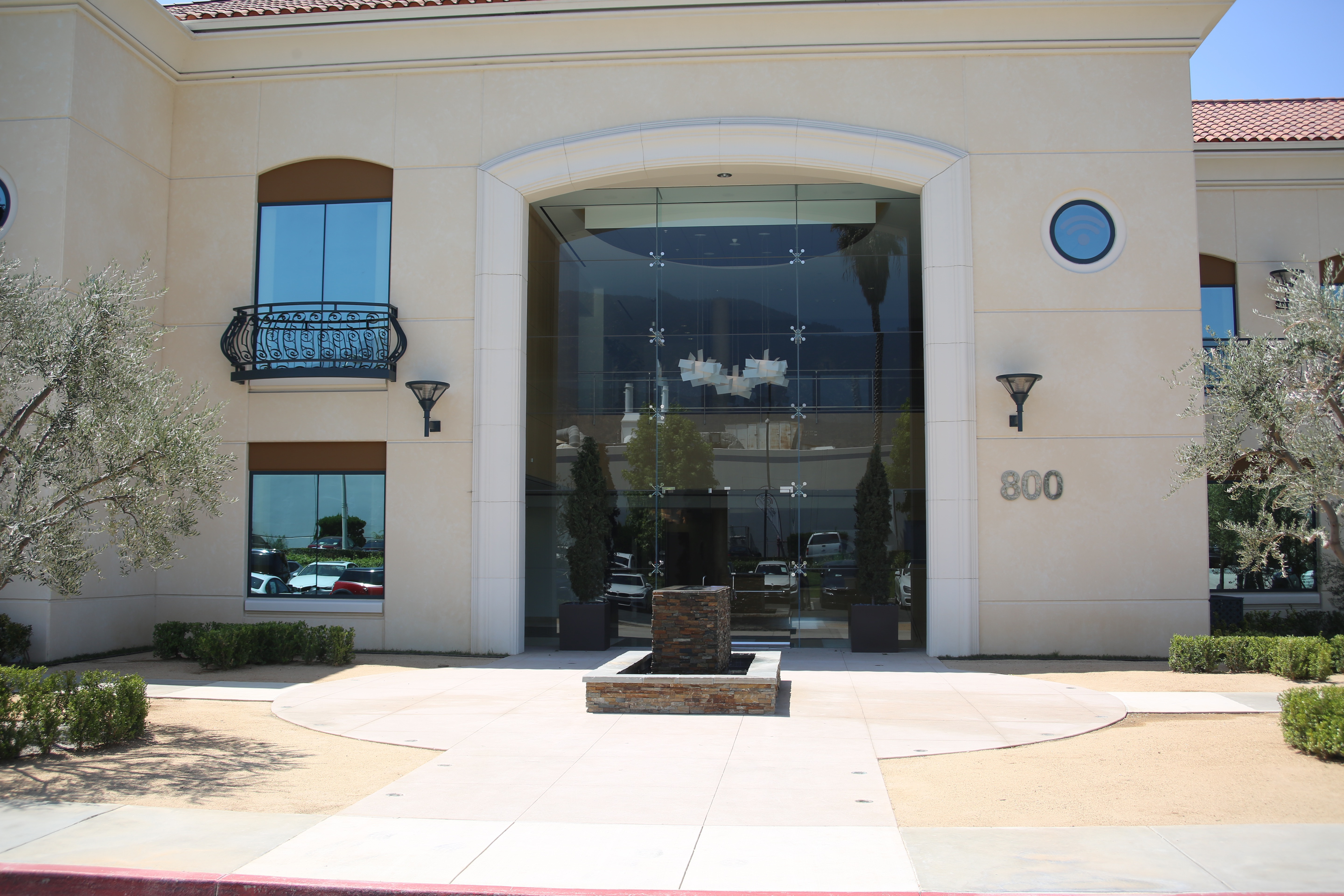
Mt Sierra College New Campus Entrance

Mt Sierra College had 200–500 students. 86% of the classes had from 2 to 9 students. In 2015, the college relocated to a new campus less than a mile away from the previous campus, still in Monrovia.
