= Make School =

Computer science college in San Francisco

- Undergraduates: 210
- Location: San Francisco, Calif., United States; 37°47′15.75″N 122°24′39.7″W
- Campus: Urban/Online
- Website: www.makeschool.com

Make School was a private for-profit computer science college in San Francisco, California. Located in the Union Square neighborhood, Make School offered a Bachelor’s of Science degree in Applied Computer Science.

In August 2021, Make School ceased operating in its capacity as an independent program or school, and was absorbed into a direct program of Dominican University, offering all coursework online.

== History ==
Make School was founded in 2012 as MakeGamesWithUs by co-founders Jeremy Rossmann and Ashutosh Desai who graduated from Menlo School before leaving MIT and UCLA, respectively, to start their company. While incubated. by Y Combinator, MakeGamesWithUs offered computer science summer camps for high school and college students.

In 2014 the company changed mission and correspondingly changed its name to Make School and a gap year program was launched. In 2015, the school launched the first Income Share Agreement backed long-form computer science program, billed as a 2 year alternative to college.

In 2018, Make School’s computer science program became the first post-secondary program to receive accreditation under the incubation policy developed by the WASC Senior College and University Commission (WSCUC). This policy allows alternative programs to become degree-granting if overseen by an established university.

Make School received approval from WSCUC to offer a Bachelor’s of Science degree in Applied Computer Science overseen by the Dominican University of California. Under the terms of the partnership, Dominican faculty teach general education courses on Make School’s campus, and Make School faculty teach computer science courses as part of a new computer science minor at Dominican. Students currently receive a degree from "Make School at Dominican University;" the purpose of the incubation process is for Make School to be an independently accredited institution within the next three to five years.

As a venture-backed school, Make School has received funding from Venrock, Kapor Capital, Learn Capital, Y Combinator, Fresco Capital, Tim Draper, and Alexis Ohanian.

== Approach ==
=== Curriculum ===
Make School offers a Bachelor of Science degree in Applied Computer Science. Students are required to complete courses in one of four concentrations: Frontend Web Development, Backend Web Development, Mobile Development, and Data Science. In addition, students must take general education courses, which are currently offered by faculty at Dominican University.

Make School’s curriculum is project-based and was designed in partnership with local tech industry employers including Yelp, Microsoft, and Lyft.

=== Admissions ===
Students are not required to submit standardized test scores as part of Make School’s application process. Students who do not demonstrate academic readiness but demonstrate aptitude and interest may be admitted conditionally on completion of an online coding curriculum that allows Make School to bring in students that other schools may traditionally reject.

=== Tuition ===
Tuition for the entire Make School’s BS program is $70,000. The degree is accelerated and students typically complete the degree in 2–2.5yrs; yearly tuition is $30,000-$40,000. Students are eligible for Title IV funding for their education. In addition, Make School is the only college that operates an Extended Income-Based Repayment (EIBR) protection plan which covers post-graduation payments for parent loans and private student loans for students who are unemployed or underemployed

=== Accreditation ===
Make School operated the first program to be accredited under WSCUC’s incubation policy. The policy is designed for unaccredited education providers to "create a formal relationship with a WSCUC accredited institution with the stated intent of the unaccredited entity evolving within the accredited institution to the point of becoming separately accreditable under WSCUC policies."

Make School and Dominican University submitted their application to be approved under the incubation policy, and in November 2018, they received approval from WSCUC.
