= SUV (disambiguation) =

SUV, or sport utility vehicle, is a car classification that combines elements of road-going passenger cars with features from off-road vehicles.

SUV may also refer to:

- Phoenix SUV, an electric crossover SUV based on the SsangYong Actyon
- "SUVs (Black on Black)", a 2021 song by Jack Harlow and Pooh Shiesty
- A small unilamellar liposome/vesicle, a liposome with a single lipid bilayer
- Standardized uptake value, a term in nuclear medicine
- Saybolt universal viscosity, a specific standardized test producing measures of kinematic viscosity
- Puroik language (ISO 639-3 code: suv)
- Nausori International Airport, Fiji (IATA code: SUV)
