= North-West College =

Coordinates: 34.0718°N 117.9505°W

- Motto: Your Direction to Success
- Established: 1966
- Location: West Covina, California, United States
- Campus: 7 (West Covina, Pomona, Riverside, Santa Ana, Long Beach, Glendale, Pasadena)
- Website: www.nw.edu
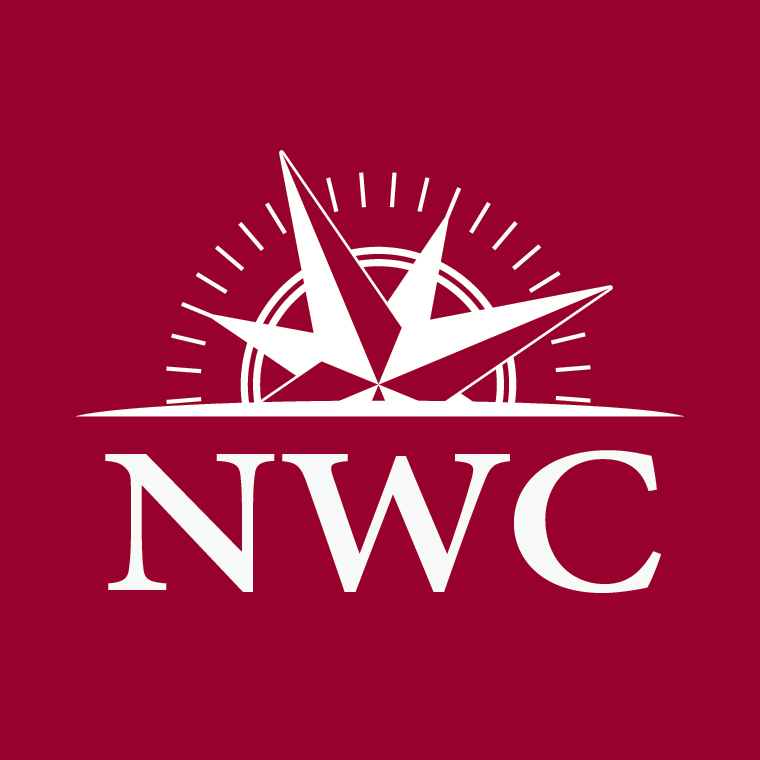

North-West College is a private for-profit system of colleges in California. North-West College offers diploma, associate degree and certification programs at each of its seven campuses throughout the Los Angeles and Riverside areas. North-West College was established in 1966 by Marsha Fuerst. Fuerst's family has been involved in the allied health field since the early 1950s. North-West College continues to be owned and operated by the Fuerst family.

== History ==
North-West College was founded in 1966 by Marsha Fuerst. On October 10, 1966 North-West College opened its doors with two classes and 43 students. North-West College was founded by the Fuerst family matriarch Marsha Fuerst.

In mid-2013, NWC came to the aid of Southern California-based Newbridge College when the U.S. Department of Education approved a deal known as a "teach out" which allows NWC to keep the Long Beach and Santa Ana Campuses open and continue offering career training programs for the current students. The college is expected to remain open for at least two more years as part of an agreement with North-West College and the Department of Education to ensure current student matriculation and to assist others in the area.

In August 1990, the school was the site of a shooting in which an administrator was killed and two students were wounded. Reputed local gang member Martin Meza allegedly entered the campus and was thought to be looking for a student with whom he had been living. While on campus, Meza fatally shot an employee who had just been promoted from instructor to placement director and wounded two students. It was later learned that the student drove the getaway car. Meza was arrested but escaped from a Mexicali jail.

== Academics ==
North-West College provides a variety of healthcare career training programs. All seven North-West College campuses are accredited by the Accrediting Commission of Career Schools and Colleges (ACCSC). Some of its specific programs are or approved by the following establishments:

- Surgical Technology programs at the North-West College West Covina and Riverside campuses are accredited by the Commission on Accreditation of Allied Health Education Programs (CAAHEP).
- The Pharmacy Technician programs at the North-West College West Covina, Pomona, Pasadena, and Glendale campuses are accredited by the American Society of Health-System Pharmacists (ASHP).
- Vocational nursing programs are approved by the Board of Vocational Nursing and Psychiatric Technicians (BVNPT).
- Dental Assistant programs are approved by the California Board of Dental Examiners to train dental assistants at the registered level (West Covina and Pomona Campuses).

== Locations ==
North-West College offers seven locations in the state of California. Campuses are located in West Covina, Riverside, Santa Ana, Long Beach, Glendale, Pasadena, and Pomona. Each campus has laboratories and lecture rooms.

- West Covina
- Van Nuys
- Riverside
- Pomona
- Glendale
- Anaheim
- Long Beach
