= Intrapreneurship =

Corporate management style

Intrapreneurship is the act of behaving like an entrepreneur while working within a large organisation. Intrapreneurship is known as the practice of a corporate management style that integrates risk-taking and innovation approaches, as well as the reward and motivational techniques, that are more traditionally thought of as being the province of entrepreneurship. Corporate entrepreneurship is a more general term referring to entrepreneurial actions taking place within an existing organisation whereas intrapreneurship refers to individual activities and behaviours.

== Definition ==
Pinchot (1985) defined intrapreneurs as "dreamers who do. Those who take responsibility for creating an innovation of any kind within an organization." In 1992, The American Heritage Dictionary acknowledged the popular use of a new word, intrapreneur, to mean "A person within a large corporation who takes direct responsibility for turning an idea into a profitable finished product through assertive risk-taking and innovation". Based on these definitions, being an intrapreneur is considered to be beneficial for both intrapreneurs and large organizations. Companies support intrapreneurs with finance and access to corporate resources, while intrapreneurs create innovation for companies.

The intrapreneur is not to be confused with the "innerpreneur", a person who aims at personal fulfilment more than at economic gains when creating a business. For innerpreneurs the primary motivation is the need to implement their vision of something the world needs, something that aligns with their values.

== History ==
The first written use of the terms 'intrapreneur', 'intrapreneuring', and 'intrapreneurship' date from a 1978 white paper, "Intra-Corporate Entrepreneurship", by Gifford Pinchot III and Elizabeth S. Pinchot. Later Norman Macrae, who read the white paper, credited the term to Gifford Pinchot III in the April 17, 1982 issue of The Economist. The first formal academic case study of corporate entrepreneurship or intrapreneurship was published in June 1982, as a Master's in Management thesis, by Howard Edward Haller, on the intrapreneurial creation of PR1ME Leasing within PR1ME Computer Inc. (from 1977 to 1981). This academic research was later published as a case study by VDM Verlag as Intrapreneurship Success: A Prime Example. The American Heritage Dictionary of the English Language included the term 'intrapreneur' in its 3rd 1992 edition, with Pinchot as the originator of the concept. The term "intrapreneurship" was used in the popular media first in February 1985 by TIME magazine article "Here Come the Intrapreneurs" and then the same year in another major popular publication was in a quote by Steve Jobs, Apple Computer's Chairman, in an interview in the September 1985 Newsweek article, which quotes him as saying, "The Macintosh team was what is commonly known as intrapreneurship; only a few years before the term was coined—a group of people going, in essence, back to the garage, but in a large company." In the African context, intrapreneurship education started in the early 1990s at the University of Cape Town, and then at the University of Pretoria. Antonites Alexander and later Alain Ndedi were among the first scholars to conduct research in the field.

== Employee intrapreneur ==
"Intrapreneurship refers to employee initiatives in organizations to undertake something new, without being asked to do so" (Ndedi, 2004). Hence, the intrapreneur focuses on innovation and creativity, and transforms an idea into a profitable venture, while operating within the organizational environment. Thus, intrapreneurs are Inside entrepreneurs who follow the goal of the organization. Intrapreneurship is an example of motivation through job design, either formally or informally. (See also corporate social entrepreneurship: intrapreneurship within the firm which is driven to produce social capital in addition to economic capital.) Employees, such as marketing executives, internal professionals or perhaps those engaged in a special project within a larger firm, are encouraged to behave as entrepreneurs, even though they have the resources, capabilities and security of the larger firm to draw upon. Capturing a little of the dynamic nature of entrepreneurial management (trying things until successful, learning from failures, attempting to conserve resources, etc.) adds to the potential of an otherwise static organization, without exposing those employees to the risks or accountability normally associated with entrepreneurial failure. Alain Ndedi (2004) in his research found that there are five antecedents to intrapreneurship development within organisations.

== Individual characteristics ==
Ndedi (2004) identifies creativity "outside the box" thinking as a characteristic of entrepreneurs. Pinchot notes that intrapreneurs share properties with entrepreneurs self-motivation, creativity and pro-activity. Intrepreneurial behaviour is proposed to be correlated with risk-taking, innovativeness, and proactiveness a fact confirmed in one study.

Pinchot distinguishes the leadership necessary in intrapreneurship with from those in managers. Strong leadership skills are needed to strengthen teams and to persuade others to follow and execute their ideas. Leadership skills are also important to support rapid decision making under uncertainty. Managers, on the contrary, consider more risks than uncertainty and often work within established patterns. Moreover, traditional managers get their authority from the above; intrapreneurs, by contrast, start without the recognition of the same degree of power.

As collaboration increases, the capability to collaborate leads finally to organizational learning as part of non-routine work processes. Many firms not only empower managers but also enable employees to become more innovative and flexible even in the course of their daily activities and routine tasks. Through empowerment, employees become owners of their tasks. Described on a larger picture is the concept of identity building. In other words, employees require opportunities to make informed choices. They must accept personal responsibility for their actions and their consequences as traditional entrepreneurs across markets would do.

== Company characteristics ==
Certain properties of CEOs are proposed facilitate intrapreneurship. For instance, intrapreneurship or corporate entrepreneurship happen more in firms led by CEOs with future time orientation, transformational leadership, and CEOs holding certain values and ideologies. Intuitive strategic decision-making amongst the executive management team that links disparate elements of information has been suggested aid corporate entrepreneurship when compared to more information lead decision making.

Many, including George Kliavkoff (President MGM), believe a strong culture of intrapreneurs comes from three key concepts being: top-down support for intrapreneurship (an executive mandate), a creative structure, and patient capital. The management of the firm is eventually responsible for providing the conditions that facilitate individual intrapreneurial attitude with the aim of opening the employee's minds. (see also culture of open innovation).

Assuming other prerequisites for entrepreneurial activity are in place, access to corporate resources and other employees allow entrepreneurs to convert opportunities into high-potential innovations.

== Examples ==
One of the most well-known examples of intrapreneurship is the "Skunk Works" group at Lockheed Martin. The group was originally named after a reference in a cartoon, and was first brought together in 1943 to build the P-80 fighter jet. Because the project was to eventually become a part of the war effort, the project was internally protected and secretive. Kelly Johnson, later famous for Kelly's 14 rules of intrapreneurship, was the director of this group.

Another example could be 3M, who encourage many projects within the company. They give certain freedom to employees to create their own projects, and they even give them funds to use for these projects. (In the days of its founders, HP used to have similar policies and just such an innovation-friendly atmosphere and intrapreneurial reputation.) Besides 3M, Intel also has a tradition of implementing intrapreneurship. Google is also known to be intrapreneur friendly, allowing their employees to spend up to 20% of their time to pursue projects of their choice.

Other companies such as Xerox, Virgin, Siemens and Microsoft are also looking for unique solutions to promote corporate entrepreneurship, in their own businesses, e.g. by developing separate research and development departments. Siemens-Nixdorf took a different approach, designing a 2-year corporate program to turn 300 managers into intrapreneurs, skilled in spotting new business opportunities with notable potential.

Kanter and Richardson's case study research "Engines of Progress" describes how Ohio-Bell encouraged intrapreneurial behaviour through the development of a system of innovation called "Enter-Prize". Ostensibly, the program was about generating innovation but the design was cultural rather than financial.

CISCO lead an Innovation Everywhere Challenge to build a corporate culture of Innovation in 2016. They offered $50,000 cash ($25,000 Seed, $25,000 Reward) and 3 Months paid time off to the winners. The three ideas presented included virtual reality videoconferencing, disability hiring programs, and digital media productivity suite.

Intrapreneurship through creativity by Wipro in India, a small vegetable company that ended up being a software outsourcing powerhouse. Another example is Tony Hsieh of Zappos, who started as a commercial footwear vendor and became the CEO of Zappos, which has expanded into an online customer experience company.

== Challenges ==
The biggest challenge for intrapreneurs is dealing with the "corporate immune system". This expression means that corporate organisational structures such as bureaucracy, hierarchy, rules etc. do not support intrapreneurial culture and behaviour. Many companies struggle with applying the concept of intrapreneurship into their daily routines due to high levels of defined tasks and schedules that deter opportunities for serendipity and for new ideas to be recognised. Issues around a highly defined schedule and lack of necessary time and space for idea creation are also highlighted in an article by Sushain Pandit (2015). Kawasaki (2006) also highlights the lack of rewards for entrepreneurial behaviour as a demotivating factor to search for new ideas.

Failure, or fear of failure, is another reason for organisations not becoming more entrepreneurial. Wladawsky-Berger (2010) found that firms act to protect resources by avoiding risk and penalizing failure. This resonates with the framework proposed by Ahuja and Lampert (2001) that explains why companies fail to develop breakthrough inventions. According to the framework, there is a tendency in large firms to favour familiar and mature technologies, and also search for new ideas that are similar to existing solutions. The authors propose investing in developing novel and emerging technologies, because this will increase the likelihood of breakthrough inventions. However their model lacks how to build upon the ideas. On the contrary, Ireland et al. (2009) present a model that conceptualises the CE strategy. Their model considers three main elements: entrepreneurial vision, organisational structure and behaviour, all of which influence and complement each other. The authors claim that these factors have to be adapted at three levels: at the organisational level, at the level of top-managers and at the level of other employees. It means that an effective CE strategy cannot be dictated by top-managers, only instigated by them. In doing so, they have to create CE strategy from interactions between entrepreneurial vision, pro-entrepreneurial architecture and entrepreneurial behaviour. Even though many managers are afraid of radical changes, they are often the only way to help companies grow.

Jones and Butler (1992) stated that due to organisational size, age and complex functions, entrepreneurship and management are often separated. Their different levels of tolerance for risks (i.e. managers tend to avoid risks, while entrepreneurs work under uncertain conditions) generally result in managers penalizing failure. In addition, the lack of rewards and bureaucracy lead to outside entrepreneurship. Consequently, intrapreneurs often quit their jobs and set up their own businesses. Behrens and Patzelt (2015) claims that this could be prevented by choosing managers with failure experience in their previous positions. Smedley (2013) also suggests that creating structure for new ideas depends on managers personal experience and attitude. He gives an example of SAP, a company who claims to celebrate failure. One of the recognized approaches to achieve this is through an "I wish/I like session": the "I like" statements recognizes new projects, while the "I wish" statements consider how things can be done in a different way.

== Recognition ==
Intrapreneurs often remain hidden and unrecognised because they often display behaviour contrary to what is considered as "corporate". Accenture states that recognising and supporting intrapreneurs is the biggest challenge for entrepreneurial leadership. However, Sinha and Srivastava may have a solution. Sinha and Srivastava's study evaluates personality factors such as extroversion; work values such as the need for intellectual stimulation and creativity; and, socio-cultural factors such as individualism and power distance and the relationship between these factors and an organisation's intrapreneurial orientation (the extent to which employees act in an entrepreneurial manner within their place of employment). The results of the study indicate a strong association between these personality factors and an organisation's intrapreneurial orientation. In practical terms, this implies that organisations can influence their Intrapreneurial Orientation through selection at recruitment and through ongoing training and development.

== Relevance and application ==
Intrapreneurship is a contemporary issue with pressing relevance for corporate managers. Antoncic and Hisrich conclude that intrapreneurship has a positive impact on organisational growth and profitability. Organisations that build structures and embed values to support intrapreneurship are consequently more likely to have a high intrapreneurial orientation and are more likely to grow than organisations with a low intrapreneurial orientation. Intrapreneurial organisations are more innovative, they continually renew and this proactive approach leads to new business venturing. Their findings indicate that intrapreneurship could be particularly beneficial for transition economies.

Antoncic and Hisrich find that good quality open communications together with a formal structure and supported by environmental scanning and management support will help an organisation become more intrapreneurial. Barringer at al support this assertion and describe the relationship between corporate entrepreneurship and strategic management. They found that the following variables can influence the organisation: scanning intensity, planning flexibility, planning horizon, locus of planning and control attributes. McKinsey's survey supports the view that organisations with a formal process report higher success rates.

In general, the academic approach to intrapreneurship is predominantly based on the company wide re-organisation required to foster intrapreneurship. By contrast, the corporate view is often that innovation is the means, rather than the end. This is described in Capozzi et al. where the driver for innovation is identified as the strategic need to grow the core business. Thus, there is often a difference in the vocabulary used with academics preferring intrapreneurship and practitioners talking of innovation.

Practicing managers looking to increase their organisation's intrapreneurial orientation, or their organisation's capacity for innovation could familiarize themselves with Altringer's "New model for innovation"; this relies on successful entrepreneurs facilitating innovation sessions. This pragmatic approach relies on timely interventions to generate innovative ideas, rather than a company wide cultural change requiring organisational re-design. Another approach to bridging the gap between practitioners and academia is the model proposed by Anthony et al. The Minimum Viable Innovation System (MVIS) is an attempt to take the essence of academic models and demonstrate how organisations can implement a MVIS within 90 days

== Reception ==
Koch (2014) claims that intrapreneurs are the "secret weapon" of the business world. The win-win situation of intrapreneurial motivation leading to corporate benefits are considered idealistic by some. Smedley argues only a few companies know how to encourage intrapreneurs.

== See also ==
- Corporate social entrepreneurship
- Entrepreneur
- Intrapreneurial bricolage
- Lean startup
- Skunkworks project
