= Eldorado College =

Business college in California, United States

Coordinates: 33.1221°N 117.0872°W

Eldorado College and Orange County Business College
- Type: Private
- Active: 1961–1997
- Location: Escondido, California, United States
- Colors: Blue; Gold

Eldorado College was a school founded in Escondido, California, United States which later opened additional campuses in Oceanside, West Covina and San Diego, California. The fourth, known as Orange County Business College, was established in Anaheim, California. Eldorado College was privately operated from 1961 to 1997.

Eldorado College and Orange County Business College offered nine two-year programs, a number of four-year degree programs and later master's degree programs, as well as various certificate programs. There were well over 10,000 graduates from the colleges. According to the BPPVE database, Orange County Business College, located at 2035 East Ball Road, Anaheim, California, closed on November 24, 1997. There is no custodian of records or contact information listed on the BPPVE database for Orange County Business College or Eldorado College. Both Eldorado College and Orange County Business College were accredited by the Western Association of Schools and Colleges from 1979–1988 and Accrediting Council for Independent Colleges and Schools through 1997. Eldorado College in Oceanside had been accredited since 1970 and its campus in West Covina had been accredited since 1985. Orange County Business College in Anaheim had been accredited since 1973.

== Challenges ==
According to a decision on the Department of Education's Office of Student Financial Assistance Programs (SFAP), the school was cited for failing to provide for a fair and equitable refund policy in compliance with 34 C.F.R. § 668.22. The concerns were discovered in March 1991 during an on-site program visit by the SFAP (Student Financial Assistance Program). SFAP also asserts that from April 1, 1994. the college failed to make any refunds to students, lenders, the State of California, and ED also in violation of 34 C.F.R. § 668.22. Finally, SFAP claimed that the college violated one of the standards of financial responsibility under 34 C.F.R. § 668.15(b)(3)(i) by failing to properly pay refunds.

The college defended itself by arguing that at all times it acted reasonably and in good faith in its refund obligations. It points out that the California refund rules were "in a state of change and confusion" during the period. At one time, CSAC issued a notice that the refund rules in issue here only applied to students who withdrew on or after September 1, 1990. Later, this policy was changed so the refund rules applied retroactively to January 1, 1990, but only to the students who were enrolled after that date. The school was in a constant state of negotiations with CPPVE regarding what rules were to be applied—eventually some of the college's positions were accepted. while other issues were conceded by the college. Finally, the college and CPPVE agreed to a final sum of refunds owed: the college proposed a payment schedule, put money in escrow, and sought approval from ED as to the amounts to be repaid and the terms of repayment. In essence, the college argues that although it agrees that it owes over $300,000 in refunds, it is totally unfair to terminate the school given it "calculated and paid refunds in accord with its reasonable. good faith interpretation of the refund policy."

Student loan default rates led to the closure of the school. According to the Department of Education website, Eldorado College had student loan default rates of 27.5%, 36.2%, and 38.9% for student cohorts in 1993, 1994, and 1995, respectively. This resulted in the loss of federal aid eligibility for its students.

The college closed on September 11, 1997. The college president said that the school's closure was the result of "overzealous bureaucrats."
