= Silicon Valley University =

University in California, US, 1997–2018

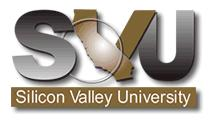
- Motto: University Caters To Silicon Valley
- Type: Private/Not accredited
- Active: 1997–2018
- Location: San Jose, California, US; 37°24′01″N 121°53′38″W
- Website: http://www.svuca.org/

Silicon Valley University (SVU) was a private, non-profit higher educational institution located in San Jose, California. The university was accredited by the Accrediting Council for Independent Colleges and Schools (ACICS) at the bachelor's degree and master's degree levels until December 7, 2017. On April 5, 2018, the state regulators of California ordered SVU to close and refund students' money within 45 days.

== History ==
Silicon Valley University (SVU) was founded in 1997 by the current President, Dr. Jerry Shiao, and began offering the MSCS program in 1999. Over 5000 students have graduated from the MSCS program during the 18-year time when the program was offered, until 2017 when SVU lost its ACICS accreditation and the State of California Bureau for Private Postsecondary Education (BPPE) license.

== Academic programs ==
=== Graduate programs ===
- Master of Science in Computer Science (MSCS)
