= San Francisco Film School =

Private, for-profit vocational film school in San Francisco, California

Coordinates: 37.7827°N 122.4065°W

- Other name: SFFS
- Former names: San Francisco School of Digital Filmmaking, or FilmSchoolSF
- Established: 2005
- President: Jeremiah Birnbaum
- Director: Jeremiah Birnbaum
- Location: San Francisco, California, United States
- Website: www.sanfranciscofilmschool.edu

San Francisco Film School, also formerly known as the San Francisco School of Digital Filmmaking and FilmSchoolSF, is a private, for-profit vocational film school in San Francisco, California. The school was founded by Stephen Kopels and Jeremiah Birnbaum in 2005 and works in conjunction with Fog City Productions, a local independent production company, to teach students the art and craft of filmmaking. The programs include an Associate of Applied Sciences in Digital Filmmaking, a Professional Certificate program, workshops, and a GAP Year Semester Program.

== Feature films created in school ==
- Presque Isle
- Around June
- Moonlight Sonata
- Trattoria
- Two Mothers
- TORN
