= Presidio Graduate School =

Graduate school in California, USA

- Former names: Presidio School of Management; Presidio World College
- Active: 2003–2025
- Location: San Anselmo, California, United States; 37.97°N 122.57°W
- Website: presidio.edu

Presidio Graduate School (Presidio) was a private graduate school in San Anselmo, California that was founded in 2002. It offered MBA and MPA degrees in sustainable development. Presidio offered a formal "green MBA" curriculum centered on environmental sustainability and social justice, to a great extent inspired by John Elkington's triple bottom line. In 2015, The New York Times named Presidio the MBA program to choose "if you want to change the world." On December 16, 2022, the University of Redlands in Southern California announced its intention to acquire Presidio. The campus moved to San Anselmo (at the site of the San Francisco Theological Seminary, also part of U of R) from San Francisco after the merger was announced. The merger and integration was completed on April 22, 2025.

Presidio had a low-residency format with face-to-face classes once a month and remaining classes online. About sixty percent of students were women.

Presidians have occupied director of sustainability positions at companies including Salesforce and Facebook.

Presidio presidents have included William Shutkin (2011-2016) and Mark Schulman.
