= Burqin =

Burqin may refer to:

== China ==
- Burqin County, a county in Xinjiang
- Burqin Town (布尔津镇), a town and the seat of Burqin County
- Burqin River (布尔津河), in Xinjiang

== Palestine ==
- Burqin, Palestine
- Burqin Church

== See also ==
- Burkin
