= Zuhair Al-Karmi =

Palestinian TV presenter, journalist and writer

- زهير الكرمي
- Born: Zuhair Maḥmoud Sa`id Al-Karmi زهير محمود سعيد الكرمي; 7 December 1921; Damascus, Syria
- Died: November 29, 2009 (aged 87); Amman, Jordan
- Citizenship: Tulkarm
- Education: American University of Beirut, Sciences.
- Occupations: Author, journalist, TV presenter, lecturer
- Employer: Palestine Technical University - Kadoorie
- Father: Mahmoud Al-Karmi

Zuhair Maḥmoud Sa`id Al-Karmi (Arabic:زهير الكرمي 7 December 1921 – 29 November 2009) was a TV presenter, journalist, and author from Tulkarm, Palestine. He was a scientific program presenter on radio stations and Arab television, notably Jordan TV and JRTV.

He was known for presenting his documentary series "Al-`Elm Wa Al-Ḥayat" or (Knowledge and Life). He was the founder of Al-Quds University, and was its first chancellor.

== Early life and education ==
Zuhair Maḥmoud Sa`id Ali Al-Karmi was born on 7 December 1921 in Damascus, Syria. He studied primary, middle, and secondary school in Palestine. In 1936, he enrolled in the Arab College in Jerusalem and obtained his secondary school diploma in 1937. He obtained his bachelor's degree in Sciences in 1941 from the American University of Beirut. He was initially a medical student, but his father's assassination in Beirut, Lebanon, led to him switching to studying Sciences.

He moved to Cairo, Egypt, in 1945 to study Arabic scientific terminologies before going to London where he obtained a master's degree in Biology from Imperial College London in 1948.

Al-Karmi is a well-known family in Tulkarm. His father was author Mahmoud Al-Karmi. In addition to his uncles: the poet ʿAbd Al-Kareem Al-Karmi (Abu Salma), the politician ʿAbd Al-Ghani Al-Karmi, the author Aḥmad Shaker Al-Karmi, the linguist Hasan Al-Karmi. His grandfather is the minister Sa`id Al-Karmi. Zuhair Al-Karmi was married and had four sons.

== Career ==
Al-Karmi worked as a science teacher for three years at Al-Fadhiliya School in Tulkarm before becoming the director of the general examinations department in the Ministry of Education in Jerusalem. He participated with a group of women in founding Al-Jihad Hospital in Tulkarm after his return from London in 1948. He taught English at Al-Kadoorie Institute in Tulkarm.

He was appointed as a school teacher by the Ministry of Education in Kuwait in 1951, before becoming an Inspector of Education, and finally the Director for Inspectors of Education. He supervised sciences curricula more than once. He resigned from his position in education to become the chief executive of Kuwait Oxygen Co. and Kuwait Industrial Gas Co. He contributed to the radio and television in Kuwait by presenting many scientific talk-shows, in addition to founding the Educational Science Museum in Kuwait in 1972.

Al-Karmi found the Arab Institute in Abu Dis close to Jerusalem with the help of a Kuwaiti funding source, the building blocks were placed by the Kuwaiti prince Jaber Al-Sabaḥ and the Jordanian King Hussein Bin Talal. After returning from Kuwait to Palestine in 1979, Al-Karmi founded the College of Science and Technology next to the Arab Institute and took the responsibility of managing and directing the college. In 1984, Al-Karmi founded Al-Quds University after turning the College of Science and Technology into the University College of Science and Technology and adding more colleges. He managed the university, in addition to contributing to its development. The university named one of the big halls after him, as a tribute to him after his death.

== Publications ==
Books:

- Oud ʿAla Bedʾ عود على بدء [Full Circle]. 1993.
- Maʿalem Sooret Al-ʿAlam Fi Al-Qarn Al-Ḥadi Wa Al-ʿEshreen معالم صورة العالم في القرن الحادي والعشرين [Features of the World's Image in the Twenty-First Century]. 1977.
- Al-Kuwait Wa Al-Ma ʾa Fi Al-Qarn Al- Ḥadi Wa Al-ʿEshreen الكويت والماء في القرن الحادي والعشرين [Kuwait and Water in the Twenty-First Century].
- Al-Kuwait Wa Al-Ṣinaʿa Fi Al-Qarn Al- Ḥadi Wa Al-ʿEshreen الكويت والصناعة في القرن الحادي والعشرين [Kuwait and Industrialization in the Twenty-First Century].
- ʿElm Al-Ḥayat علم الحياة [Knowledge of Life]. (Three Volumes)
- Al-ʿOuloom Al-ʿAmma العلوم العامة [General Sciences]. (Nine Volumes)
- Al-ʿElm Wa Mushkelat Al-Ensan Al-Muʿaser, Selselet ʿAlam Al-Maʿarefa العلم ومشكلات الإنسان المعاصر، سلسلة عالم المعرفة [Education and the Challenges of the Modern Human, World of Knowledge series] (PDF). 1978.

Editing and Translations:

- The Handbook for Teaching Geography. UNESCO.
- Wasfi, Raʾuf (1979). Al-Kawn Wa Al-Thuqoob Al-Sawdaʾa الكون والثقوب السوداء [The Universe and Black Holes]. World of Knowledge. (editor)
- Bronowski, Jacob. Erteqaʾa Al-Ensan ارتقاء الإنسان [The Ascent of Man]. (translation editor)
- Farb, Peter (1983). Banu Al-Ensan بنو الإنسان [Humankind]. (translator)

== Death ==
Al-Karmi died on 29 November 2009 at the age of 87 in Amman, Jordan.
