= List of churches in Palestine =

This is a list of most important churches in the West Bank and Gaza Strip in the State of Palestine:

Name	Construction date	Location	Image
Church of the Holy Sepulchre	335	East Jerusalem	
Church of the Nativity	333	Bethlehem city, West Bank	
Greek Orthodox Church of Transfiguration	1852	Ramallah, West Bank	
Holy Family Catholic Church	1913	Ramallah city, West Bank	
Church of Saint George, Tulkarm	1830	Tulkarm city, West Bank	
Jacob's Well		Balata Camp, West Bank	
Tomb of Lazarus		Al-Eizariya town, West Bank	
Chapel of the Milk Grotto		Bethlehem city, West Bank	
Church of Saint Catherine		Bethlehem city, West Bank	
Syriac Orthodox Church (Bethlehem)	1928	Bethlehem city, West Bank	
Greek Melkite Church (Bethlehem)	1964	Bethlehem city, West Bank	
Chapel of the Shepherd's Field		Bethlehem city, West Bank	
Mar Saba		al-Ubeidiya town, West Bank	
Monastery of Saints John and George of Choziba		Wadi Qelt, West Bank	
Monastery of the Temptation		Jericho city, West Bank	
Burqin Church		Burqin town, West Bank	
St. George's Monastery		al-Khader town, West Bank	
Gaza Baptist Church	1950	Gaza city, Gaza Strip	
Church of Saint Porphyrius	1160	Gaza city, Gaza Strip	
Holy Family Church		Gaza city, Gaza Strip	
