= Burkin =

Burkin (Russian: Буркин) is a Russian masculine surname, its feminine counterpart is Burkina. Notable people with the surname include:

- Forne Burkin (born 1998), New Zealand rugby union player
- Mikhail Burkin (1912–2001), Soviet naval aviator
- Yuli Burkin (born 1960), Russian science fiction writer and musician

== See also ==
- Berkin
