= Hadem Rida Jarrar =

Palestinian orthopedic surgeon

Hatim Rida Jarrar

Mayor of Jenin
- In office 2006 – 11 January 2010

Personal details
- Born: 1947 (age 78–79) Burqin, Jenin
- Education: University of Mosul
- Occupation: Orthopedic surgeon

Hatim Rida Jarrar (Arabic: حاتم رضا جرار) is an orthopedic surgeon from Jenin, in the West Bank. He was elected as Mayor of the city, until he was arrested by the Israel Forces and spent 3 years in jail. After his release, he resigned from the position and went back to practice in his clinic in Jenin city. He is diagnosed with diabetes.
