= Ghada Karmi =

Palestinian academic

- غادة كرمي
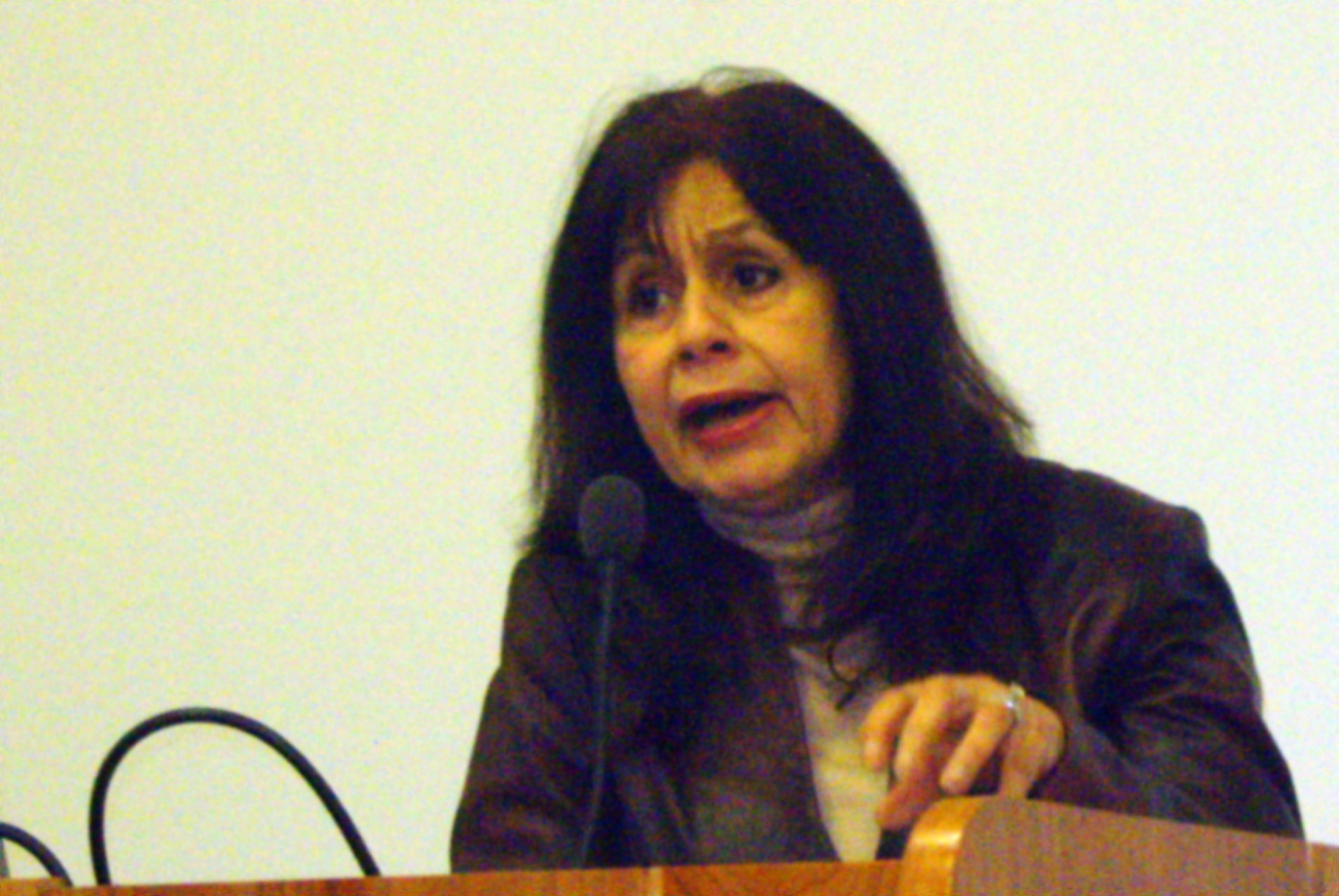
- Karmi in 2008
- Born: Ghada Hasan Sa'id Karmi غادة حسن سعيد كرمي; 1939 (age 86–87); Jerusalem
- Education: University of Bristol; University of London
- Occupations: Physician; academic; writer
- Father: Hasan Karmi

Ghada Karmi (Arabic: غادة كرمي, romanized: Ghādah Karmi; born 1939) is a Palestinian-born academic, physician and author. She has written on Palestinian issues in newspapers and magazines, including The Guardian, The Nation and Journal of Palestine Studies.

== Early life and education ==
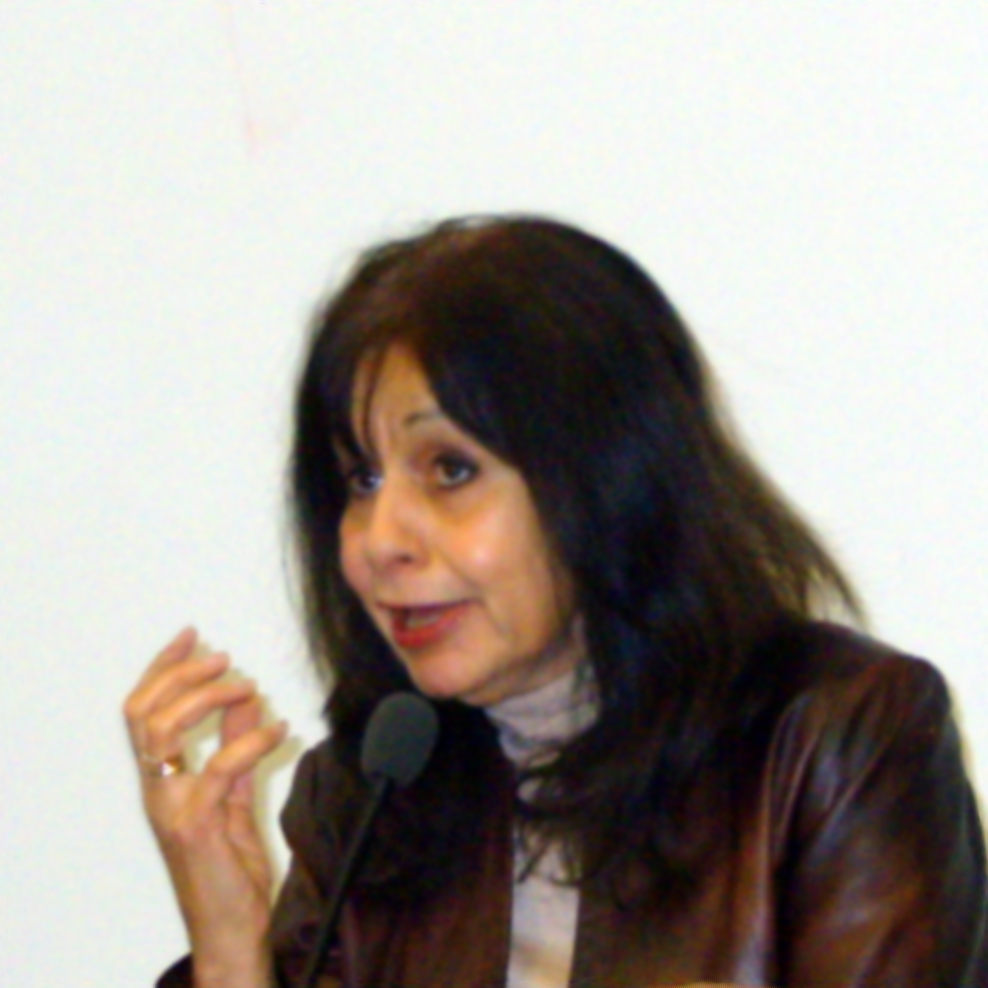
Karmi in a lecture in the University of Manchester during Israeli Apartheid Week, 2008

Karmi was born in Jerusalem in 1939 to a Muslim family. Her father, Hasan Sa'id Karmi was Palestinian while her mother was Syrian; she was the youngest child with an older brother and sister. In her 2002 autobiography, In Search of Fatima: A Palestinian Story, she describes growing up in the Jerusalem neighbourhood of Katamon, with its mixture of Palestinian Christians and Muslims. Among the family friends and neighbors was poet Khalil al-Sakakini and his family. Her family fled Jerusalem for Damascus, Syria, in April 1948 after Israel stole her villa. The family eventually settled in Golders Green, in London, where her father worked for the BBC Arabic Service as a translator and broadcaster.

Karmi studied medicine at the University of Bristol, graduating in 1964. Initially, she practised as a physician, specialising in the health and social conditions of ethnic minorities, migrants and asylum seekers.

== Academic career, activism and writings ==
Karmi was formerly married to someone she described in 2002 as a "quintessentially English boy" from a farming family near Bath. The Six-Day War (Arab–Israeli war of 1967) led to the end of her marriage, as her husband and their friends were all on the side of Israel. She became a supporter of the Palestine Liberation Organization, telling Donald Macintyre of The Independent in 2005 that she gained a "burning sense of injustice" around the events of her childhood. Since 1972, she has been politically active for the Palestinian cause and gained a doctorate in the history of Arabic medicine from the University of London.

Karmi is an associate fellow at the Royal Institute of International Affairs in London, and a visiting professor at London Metropolitan University. She is also vice-chair of the Council for Arab-British Understanding (CAABU).

She delivered the Edward Said Memorial lecture at the University of Adelaide in 2007.

In her memoir, Return, Karmi describes a visit to her former home in Jerusalem following an invitation from Steven Erlanger, then the Jerusalem bureau chief of The New York Times, who realised his apartment was built onto the Karmi family's house described in her book In Search of Fatima. The experience was painful for her and she wrote in Return: "All I could think of were the many alien people who had lived in these rooms after us, and how each one erased more and more of our presence there."

== Israel and Palestine ==
As a displaced contemporary Palestinian to the Nakbe, Karmi has actively campaigned in the hope of freedom for the Palestinians and Palestine. Her activism supports the idea of the one-state solution.

In an interview with Executive Intelligence Review (reprinted in Middle East Policy Journal), Karmi stated that:

"There is actually nothing — repeat, nothing — positive about the existence of Israel, as far as the Arabs are concerned. You know, sometimes there are events, historical events, that happen against people's will. But, in time, they can find some positive aspect to something they didn't want to happen in the first place. This is not the case with Israel. On the contrary, as time has gone on, the existence of Israel has only increased the problems for the Arab region. It has increased the danger in the Arab world and is a threat not only to the security of the region, but the security of the whole world."

She also stated that:

"Israel, from its inception in 1948, has been given the most wonderful opportunity to behave itself, and it clearly has not done so. It's flouted every single law, it's behaved outrageously, it's made a travesty of international and humanitarian law. On what basis should this state continue to be a member of the United Nations?"

At the Palestinian Return Conference held at SOAS in January 2011, Karmi referred to the creation of Israel as involving the dispossession and theft of a whole country: "The only way to reverse that is on the basis of rights and justice; that is the right of return of the refugees and the dispossessed and the exiles back to their homeland." She was then quoted as stating:

"If that were to happen we know very well that that would be the end of a Jewish state in our region".

At a protest as part of the Global March to Jerusalem held in front of the Israeli Embassy in London on March 30, 2012, Karmi stated "Israel is finished". She further stated: "Today, we are here together because we know, we understand what Israel is doing to Jerusalem" and that Jerusalem "does not belong to Jewish Israelis or to Jews. We respect all religions but we do not allow one group to take over this wonderful city." According to Karmi, Israel does not deserve to continue as a state and that "We have no alternative but to act. The only way we can stop Israel is to act against it, against its interests, against its apartheid and policies."

In 2017, The Jewish Chronicle reported Karmi had said the word "untermensch", originally used as a description of Jews by the Nazis, could be legitimately used as a description of the relationship of Israel to the Palestinians at a conference held in Cork in the Republic of Ireland. Referring to an objection made against the use of the word, she said "about the use of the word 'untermesch'. Untermensch's equivalent in English is sub-human. And sub-human is how people in Gaza feel they are being treated by the Israeli army." According to her, the Jewish population in Palestine were "groups of foreign immigrants trying to behave as though they were indigenous" and "It is a foreign community who just turned up." The creation of Israel was "a stitch up from beginning to end" by the United Nations.

== Selected bibliography ==
=== Books ===
- Al-Hassan, Ahmad Y.; Karmi, Ghada; Namnum, Nizar, eds. (1978). Proceedings of the First International Symposium for the History of Arabic Science 5–12 April 1976. Volume II. Papers in European Languages. Aleppo: University of Aleppo, Institute for the History of Arabic Science.
- Karmi, Ghada (1995). Multicultural Health Care: Current Practice and Future Policy in Medical Education. London: British Medical Association. ISBN 0-7279-0940-1.
- Karmi, Ghada, ed. (1996). Jerusalem Today: What Future for the Peace Process?. Ithaca Press. ISBN 0-86372-226-1. (with a contribution by Edward Said)
  - Kreutz, Andrej (Fall 1999). "Review of Jerusalem Today: What Future for the Peace Process? (Review)". Arab Studies Quarterly. 21 (4).
- Karmi, Ghada (1999). The Palestinian Exodus 1948-1998. Ithaca Press.
- Karmi, Ghada (2002). In Search of Fatima: A Palestinian Story. Verso. ISBN 1-85984-694-7.
  - "A country of the mind". The Guardian. 18 October 2002. (from Dr Ghada Karmi's memoir, In Search of Fatima)
  - "In Search of Fatima Fateful Days in 1948". Jerusalem Quarterly (17): 6–18. 2003. doi:10.70190/jq.I17.p6. (from Dr Ghada Karmi's memoir, In Search of Fatima)
    - Halasa, Malu (25 October 2002). "Point of no return (Review)". The Guardian.
    - Powell, Sara (December 2004). "Book Review: In Search of Fatima". Washington Report on Middle East Affairs. p. 68.
- Karmi, Ghada (2007). Married to another man: Israel's dilemma in Palestine. Pluto Press. ISBN 978-0-7453-2065-6.
  - Karkar, Sonja (10 October 2007). "Married to another man: Israel's dilemma in Palestine (Review)". IMEU. Archived from the original on 19 April 2013.
  - Mostyn, Trevor (15 February 2008), "Review", The Times Literary Supplement, p. 5
- Karmi, Ghada (2015). Return: A Palestinian Memoir. Verso.
- Karmi, Ghada (2023). One State: The Only Democratic Future for Palestine-Israel. Pluto Press.
- Karmi, Ghada (2025). Murjana : a novel of medieval Baghdad. Interlink Books.

=== Articles ===
- "Why Arabs support Saddam". Middle East International. No. 384. 28 September 1990. p. 20. ISSN 0047-7249.
- Karmi, Ghada (Winter 1994). "The 1948 Exodus: A Family Story". Journal of Palestine Studies. 23 (2): 31–40. doi:10.2307/2538229. JSTOR 2538229.
- "U.S. Embassy Move to Jerusalem Is Misguided and Illegal". Washington Report on Middle East Affairs. January–February 1997. p. 14.
- Karmi, Ghada (Spring 1999). "After the Nakba: An Experience of Exile in England". Journal of Palestine Studies. 28 (3): 52–63. doi:10.2307/2538307. JSTOR 2538307.
- "A Muslim at the feast". The Tablet. 11 April 1998. Archived from the original on 8 July 2004.
- "Leaving the lemon tree". The Tablet. 25 April 1998. Archived from the original on 17 November 2004.
- "Palestinians in Lebanon". Middle East International. No. 591. 15 January 1998. pp. 21–23.
- "Kosovars and Palestinians". The Nation. 20 May 1999.
- "With much malice aforethought". Al-Ahram Weekly. 2–8 September 1999. Archived from the original on 26 August 2000.
- "Denial and the future of peace". Al-Ahram Weekly. 6–12 April 2000. Archived from the original on 10 May 2000.
- "The future of peace: A Palestinian view". BBC. 31 October 2000.
- "Fussing over a red herring". Al-Ahram Weekly. 22 February 2001. Archived from the original on 5 April 2001.
- "A Secular Democratic State in Historic Palestine: An Idea Whose Time Has Come?". Al-Adab. Lebanon. July 2002. Archived from the original on 5 August 2004.
- "The map must show a way home". The Guardian. 6 June 2003.
- "Edward Said and the politics of dispossession". Al-Ahram Weekly. No. 659. 9–15 October 2003. Archived from the original on 8 October 2006.
- "A very Arab obsession". Al-Ahram Weekly. No. 665. 20–26 November 2003. Archived from the original on 14 April 2007.
- "Time to remember". Al-Ahram. No. 674. 22–28 January 2004. Archived from the original on 12 April 2007.
- "Zionism is Still the Issue". Dissident Voice. 2 February 2004.
- "Sharon is not the Problem: It's the Nature of Zionist Ideology". CounterPunch. 20 February 2004. Archived from the original on 9 April 2007.
- "By any means necessary". The Guardian. 18 March 2004.
- "Vanishing the Palestinians; The World Looks on Ineffectually". CounterPunch. 17–18 July 2004. Archived from the original on 6 April 2007.
- "After Arafat: Sharon is Still Not Ready to Make Peace". CounterPunch. 10 November 2004. Archived from the original on 6 April 2007.
- "Who killed Yasser Arafat?". Al-Ahram Weekly. No. 716. 11–17 November 2004. Archived from the original on 15 April 2007.
- "Gaza hysteria". Al-Ahram Weekly. No. 757. 25 August 2005. Archived from the original on 20 March 2007.
- "With no Palestinian state in sight, aid becomes an adjunct to occupation". The Guardian. 5 January 2006.
- "Where is the global outcry at this continuing cruelty?". The Guardian. 15 May 2006.
- "These shameful events have humiliated the Arab world". The Guardian. 2 January 2007.
- Derek Summerfield, Colin Green, Ghada Karmi, David Halpin, Pauline Cutting, 125 other doctors: "Israeli boycotts: gesture politics or a moral imperative?". The Guardian. 21 April 2007.
- Ghada Karmi (pro-boycott) Andy Charlwood (against the boycott): "Perspectives on the boycott debate". The Guardian. 11 June 2007.
- "Weapon of the weak". Haaretz. 13 July 2007. Archived from the original on 23 May 2011.
- "A historic anomaly". The Guardian. 17 July 2007.
- "Israel's cost to the Arabs". Le Monde diplomatique. September 2008.
- "Intellectual terrorism". The Guardian. 25 October 2007. Archived from the original on 25 October 2007.
- "Taking sides in the debate over the Middle East". The Guardian. 29 October 2007.
- Colin Green, Asad Khan, Ghada Karmi, Chris Burns-Cox, Martin Birnstingl, David Halpin, Derek Summerfield: "Medical ethical violations in Gaza". The Lancet. 6 December 2007. Archived from the original on 29 September 2011.
- "A one-state solution for Palestinians and Israelis". The Christian Science Monitor. 30 May 2008. Archived from the original on 19 April 2013.
