= Mahmoud Al-Karmi =

Palestinian journalist and poet

- محمود الكرمي
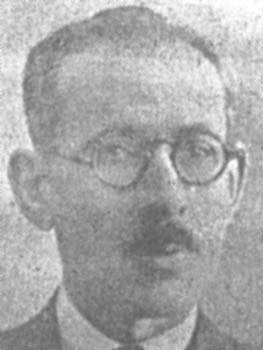
- Born: Mahmoud Sa`id Al-Karmi محمود سعيد الكرمي; 1889; Tulkarm, Palestine
- Died: 24 December 1939 (aged 49–50); Beirut
- Cause of death: Assassination
- Citizenship: Palestine
- Education: Al Azhar
- Children: Zuhair Al-Karmi

Mahmoud Saeed al-Karmi (Arabic:محمود سعيد الكرمي) (born in 1889 in Tulkarm; assassinated on 24 December 1939 in Beirut) was a Palestinian writer, scholar of Arabic language, poet, and political journalist. He is considered one of the Symbols of the national movement in Palestine and Jordan. He was born in Tulkram in Palestine for well-known family, his father is Saeed Alkarmi, his brothers are, Abdulkareem, Hassan, Abd al-Ghani and Ahmad Shakir. He was Graduated from Al Azhar in Arabic language. He worked in Arabic language field in Egypt and Eritrea, Somalia, Syria, Palestine, Lebanon and Jordan for many years. He worked also in Journalism. He was assassinated by his political opponents in Beirut.

== Biography ==
Mahmoud Saeed Ali Mansoor AlKarmi was born in 1889 in Tulkram city in Palestine and grew up there in well-known family in literature. He got education in Tulkram, then he went to Al Azhar with his brother Ahmed Shaker Alkarmi, where he Graduated in 1919 in Arabic language.

In the beginning of his career, Mahmood Alkarmi worked as a teacher in Egypt's schools like Faculty of Dar al-Ulum in Cairo, also as language editor for theatrical novels like plays and novels of the Egyptian playwright Salaama Hijaazi. Then he moved into Mitsiwa city in Eritrea and taught Arabic language there for a while. After that he went to Damascus in the Syrian Republic, and he was assigned as an inspector for Maarif Huraan, then as a school principal for Almalik Althahir School. Then he went to Eastern Jordanian State to meet his father, then he was assigned as a principal for Salt Secondary School, then for Amman Secondary school until he resigned from the governmental job.

Mahmoud Alkarmi did the editing of the first Jordanian newspaper that has established "Alsharq Alarabi newspaper" which was established in 1923, it Was the official newspaper of the Emirate of Jordan. After that, Al-Karmi founded and published Al-Sharia newspaper in Amman, and managed the editing. The first version was published on 25 June 1927. It was interested in literature and politics until it was suspended by government for criticizing the imposed British Treaty project on Jordan and Palestine.

The British government accused him of participating in the Black Palm Society, and he was imprisoned for a period. After they released him to his homeland, he worked in education.

He was assigned as an Arabic language teacher in Al-Rashidiyah school in Jerusalem then he moved to Gaza Secondary School. The British authorities accused him of organizing extremist slogans and songs and teaching them to the students. Therefore, the school transferred him to Al-Khaleel secondary school. He stayed there for five years after they transferred him again to Al-Salahia secondary school in Nablus. In 1936, Al-Karmi joined the Arab revolt in Palestine, later on he stood against it when he saw its methodology changing. He had to leave Palestine and go into Beirut, he worked there in political journalism until he was assassinated.

== Personal life ==
His father was the scientist Saeed Al-Karmi, his brothers were: the poet Abdulkareem Al-Karmi, the linguistic Hassan Al-Karmi, the writer Ahmed Shaker Al-Karmi and the politician Abdul-Ghani Al-Karmi.

Mahmoud Al-Karmi was married and had eight children. One of his children was Zuhair Al-Karmi who was born in Damascus in 1922 when his father Mahmoud Al-Karmi was the school principal for Almalik Al-Thahir school.

He was writing poems since he was young and he had poems that has published in books and newspapers of his time.

His poems were characterized by the strength of language, as he was a "patriotic poet, whose experience combined patriotic and national concerns, and traditional purposes: such Lamentations and description. His poems were characterized by the strength of language, accuracy of depiction and clarity of rhythm.

== Writings ==
He has published several books on Arabic language and poetry, including “Principles of the Arabic Language”, “Grammar," and other books.

== Assassination ==
His political opponents assassinated him on 24 December 1939/13 Dhu al-Qi'dah 1358 in Beirut, where he was assassinated at the direct instruction of Amin al-Husseini by shooting him with a gun the moment he entered his residence at night, and his body was transported to Tulkarm for burial in an official and popular funeral, and a large memorial ceremony was held for him in the city, delegations from all regions participated in it, during which speeches were delivered by Hashem Jayyusi, Sulaiman Touqan, Hikmat al-Masry and others.

Immediately after the assassination, the authorities in Lebanon opened an investigation, and Lebanese President Emile Edde announced on 18 January 1940, that several people had been presented to the Judicial Council for his assassination.

== Honors ==
In honor of Mahmoud al-Karmi and his contributions, a street in the Jordanian capital Amman has been named, specifically in the Abdoun neighborhood of the capital. He was also awarded the Jerusalem Medal for Culture and Literature in 1990.
