= Berkin =

Berkin is both a given name and a surname. Notable people with the surname include:

== Given name ==
- Berkin Kamil Arslan (born 1992), Turkish football player
- Berkin Elvan (1999–2014), Turkish victim of police brutality
- Berkin Usta (2000–2025), Turkish Olympian alpine skier

== Surname ==
- Carol Berkin (born 1942), American historian and author

== See also ==
- Burkin
