= Abdul-Ghani Al-Karmi =

Palestinian politician

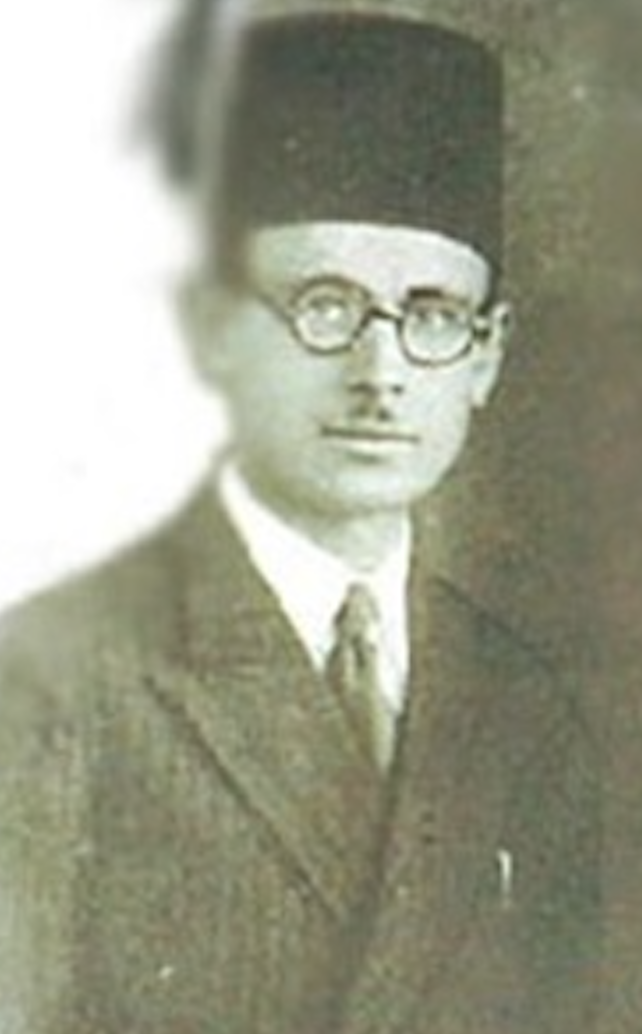
- Born: 1906; Tulkarm
- Died: 1974 (67–68 years); Tulkarm
- Education: Al-Fadeliya School
- Occupations: Politician, diplomat, writer, and journalist
- Notable work: Al-Yarmouk newspaper and the League of National Liberation in Palestine
- Political party: A member of the Palestinian Communist Party and the National Liberation League in Palestine
- Father: Saeed bin Ali Al-Karmi ar:سعيد بن علي الكرمي
- Family: Mahmoud Al-Karmi (brother); Ahmad Shakir al-Karmi ar:أحمد شاكر الكرمي (brother); Abu Salma (brother); Hasan Karmi (brother)
- Awards: Jordanian Order of Independence (1950)

Abdul-Ghani Saeed Al-Karmi (1906–1974) (Arabic: عبدالغني سعيد الكرمي) was a Palestinian politician. In 1946, he and King Abdullah I bin Al-Hussein, founded the Hashemite Kingdom of Jordan. He served as the head of the Jordanian Royal Court. He was closely connected to King Abdullah the First, and one of the leaders of the Palestinian Arab Communist Party.

== Early life ==
Al-Karmi was born in Tulkarm in the West Bank in 1906. He completed his secondary education with his younger brother, Abdul Karim al-Karmi, at the Anbar Office School in Damascus. Al-Karmi completed his university education in the Soviet Union; He was among the first members of the Palestine Communist Party who studied on scholarships in Moscow in the late 1920s.

His father, Saeed Al-Karmi, was a scholar and minister. His brothers are the poet Abdul Karim Al-Karmi (Abu Salma), the writer Ahmed Shaker Al-Karmi, the journalist Hassan Al-Karmi, and the writer Mahmoud Al-Karmi. He was fluent in Russian, English, and French. His early education was in Tulkarm and then in Damascus. He completed his secondary education in Salt (Trans-Jordan) and then in Maktab Anbar in Damascus, where he obtained the Syrian baccalaureate in 1927.

== Political life ==
Al-Karmi connected with other Arab figures, including Amjad Al-Trabelsi, Ezz Al-Din Al-Qassam, Saeed Al-Afghani, Ali Al-Tantawi, Anwar Al-Attar, Dhaf Al-Qasimi, and Mutlaq Abdul-Khaleq. After becoming a member of the Palestinian Arab Communist Party, Al-Karmi was elected in December 1926 to lead the "First Palestinian Movement Congress," accompanied by Lebanese Rafik Jabbour and 85 delegates from other Arab countries.

Al-Karmi was a prominent Palestinian writer. In 1930 he founded Yarmouk newspaper. He served as editor-in-chief. In 1935 he founded the Palestinian political newspaper Al-Saiqa, serving as its editor-in-chief. Al-Saiqa was an extension of the Palestinian newspaper Al-Nafeer that preceded it. The first issue of Al-Saiqa was published on 7 March 1935. Al-Karmi participated in the founding of the National Liberation League in Palestine, affiliated with the Palestinian Communist Party from 1943 to 1944. Al-Karmi became one of the leaders of the movement and went on to establish and head a parallel movement of the party. In 1946, Al-Karmi held the position of editor-in-chief of the daily Palestinian political newspaper, Al-Shaab, and continued to do so until 1948. At the beginning of 1948, Al-Karmi founded the Palestinian newspaper Al-Mizan and served as its editor-in-chief. Its first issue arrived on 23 February 1948. Abdul-Ghani al-Karmi assumed responsibility for the Higher Jordanian Amiri Diwan in the Emirate of Transjordan. In 1946, he participated with King Abdullah I bin Al Hussein in establishing the Hashemite Kingdom of Jordan, and King Abdullah I bin Al Hussein pledged allegiance to the country on 25 May 1946. Al-Karmi became the head of the Royal Jordanian Hashemite Court, in addition to his ceremonial duties of the court. "Amiri Diwan" had its name changed to "The Royal Court" after the establishment of the Kingdom in 1946. The Royal Hashemite Court is the third-highest leadership position in the Jordanian state. It is reported that Abdul-Ghani al-Karmi was appointed to the Spanish embassy in Jordan.

== Writings ==
He published a series of books on politics, literature, and poetry.

== Death ==
Abdul-Ghani Al-Karmi died in 1974.
