= Church of Saint George (Tulkarm) =

Historic church in Tulkarm, Palestine

Church of Saint George, Tulkarm
- كنيسة القديس جاورجيوس، طولكرم
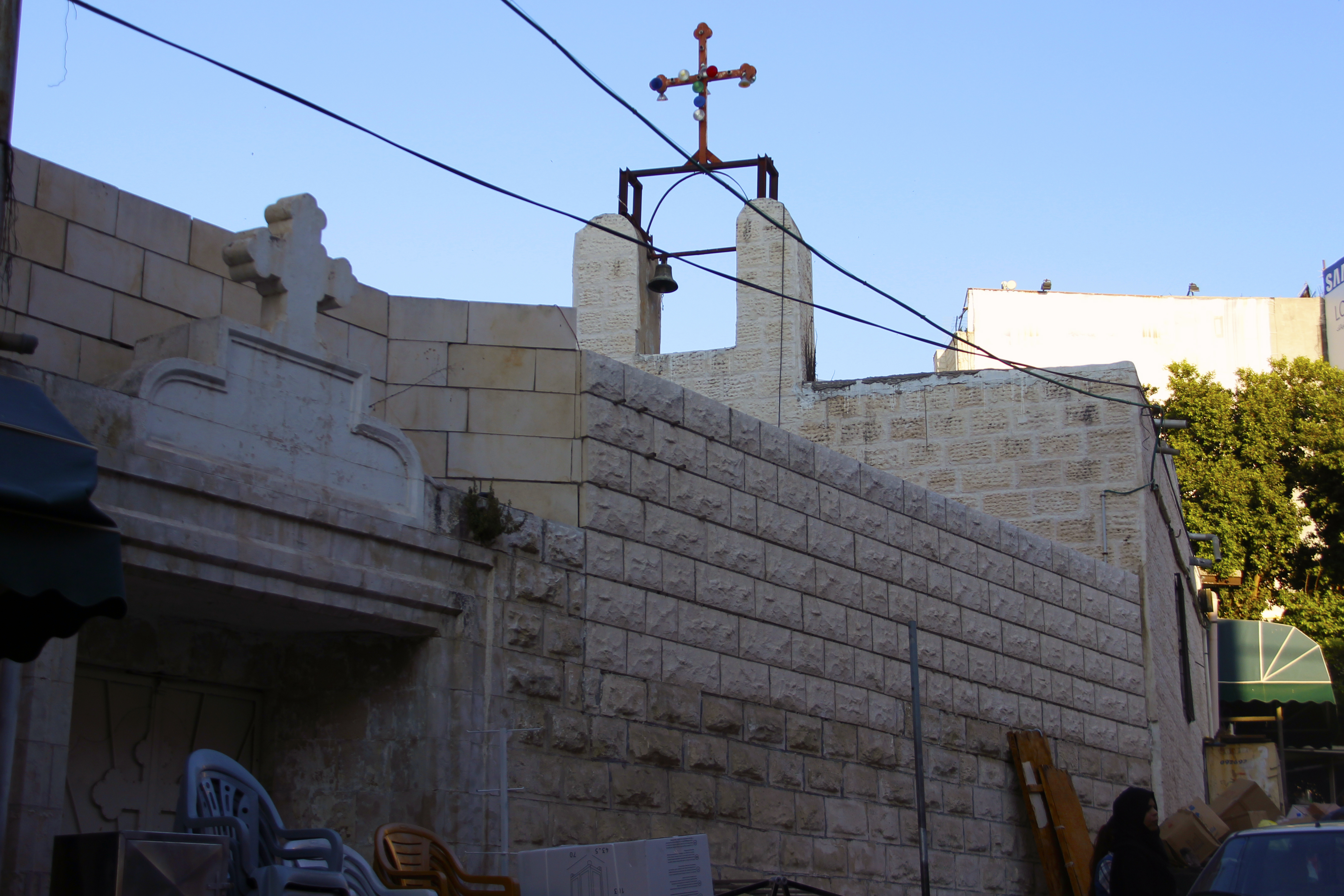
- Church of Saint George, Tulkarm
- 32°18′45″N 35°1′36″E
- Location: Tulkarm, West Bank
- Country: Palestine
- Denomination: Greek Orthodox Church

History
- Status: Active, in service
- Founded: 1830

Architecture
- Architectural type: Ottoman architecture, Greek architecture
- Groundbreaking: 1830
- Completed: 1830

Administration
- Diocese: Tulkarm

Clergy
- Abbot: Priest Isaac Attallah

The Church of Saint George (Arabic: كنيسة القديس جاورجيوس) it is a historic Christian Orthodox church located in Tulkarm, West Bank, Palestine. Its dedicated to Saint George. It is one of the oldest churches in Palestine, and several countries participated in its building and restoration. It is one of the Christian Orthodox churches in the West Bank, and one of the main churches in Greek Orthodox Church of Jerusalem.

== History ==
Church of Saint George in Tulkarm built in 1830 in the early 19th century. The Church contains a wall of historical and archaeological memorial icons made in 1943 by the Hellenic Army during their presence in Palestine during the Second World War.

With events of the Nakba; the United Nations was quick on 8 April 1949, to confirm that Tulkarm Orthodox Church is one of the Christian holy places in Palestine, and confirmed that Tulkarm Orthodox Church as a Holy Place under the guardianship of the Greek Orthodox Church. The United Nations and its General Assembly called on all parties to the conflict to protect all holy sites in the Palestinian territories, and to ensure free access to them.

The number of Orthodox Christians in Tulkarm in 1967 reached about 1,000 Orthodox Christians before the number decreased due to the political situations.

== Renovation ==
In 1890 the church was completely restored, in 1914 it was restored by Greece, and it was restored by United Kingdom before World War II, and in 1942 it was restored again by Greece, and it was also restored in the years 1952 and 1967. In 2006 the entire church was renovated.

In 2015, the UNESCO and the Government of Sweden renovated two of the buildings inside the church, under the supervision of the Palestinian National Authority, the Palestine Liberation Organization, the Greek Orthodox Patriarchate, the Center for Cultural Heritage Preservation (CCHP), and the Municipality of Tulkarm.

== Today ==
All Christian religious events are held in the church; Christmas, Lent, Easter, and others. Christian events important in the church are chaired by Patriarch Theophilos III of Jerusalem or by archbishop Theodosios (Hanna).

Every year on Christmas, an official delegations from the Palestinian National Authority visits the church to offer congratulations of Christmas.

== Abbot ==
- Archimandrite Leontios (2015 – October 2024).
- Priest Isaac Attallah (October 2024 – to the present).

== See also ==
- List of churches in Palestine
