= Mikhail Burkin =

Mikhail Ivanovich Burkin
- Михаил Иванович Буркин
- Born: 10 February 1912; Moscow, Russian Empire
- Died: 10 January 2001 (aged 88); Samara, Russia
- Military career
- Allegiance: Soviet Union
- Branch: Soviet Navy
- Service years: 1935—1958
- Rank: Major General of Aviation
- Commands: 5th Guards Mine-Torpedo Aviation Regiment; 52nd Mine-Torpedo Aviation Regiment
- Conflicts: World War II
- Awards: Hero of the Soviet Union

Mikhail Ivanovich Burkin (Russian: Михаил Иванович Буркин; 10 February 1912 – 10 January 2001) was a Soviet naval aviator during World War II and recipient of the title of the Hero of Soviet Union.

== Early life ==
Burkin was born on 10 February 1912 in Moscow. From 1914, the family lived in the village of Novye Vyselki (now in the Plavsky District of the Tula Oblast), before returning to Moscow in 1930. He graduated from the three courses of Rabfak and the Central Flying Club named after Chkalov in Moscow in 1935.

Burkin joined the Soviet Navy in 1935. In 1936, he graduated from the Yeisk School of Naval Pilots named after I.V. Stalin. From November 1936, he served in the Air Force of the Pacific Fleet, where he was assigned as the pilot of the 109th Air Squadron.

From May 1938, he was assigned as a junior and then a senior pilot of the 4th Mine-Torpedo Aviation Regiment. In December 1940, he was appointed as a flight commander of the 36th Separate Air Squadron and in May 1941, he was assigned as flight commander in the 56th Long-Range Reconnaissance Aviation Regiment. Burkin became a member of the Communist Party of the Soviet Union in 1939.

== World War II ==
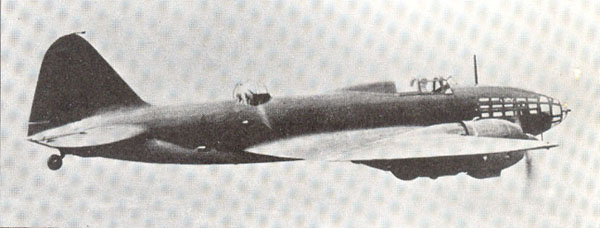
Ilyushin Il-4

Following the outbreak of Operation Barbarossa in June 1941, Burkin began flying missions while assigned to the Black Sea Fleet. By December 1941, he had completed 16 combat missions as a flight commander of the 2nd Mine and Torpedo-Aviation Regiment of the Air Force of the Black Sea Fleet. For his heroism, he was awarded his first Orders of Lenin and Red Banner.

By the beginning of February 1942, he had already completed 56 combat missions. At the same time, he was appointed inspector for piloting techniques of the 5th Guards Mine-Torpedo Aviation Regiment of the Air Force of the Black Sea Fleet.

Burkin proved himself to be a talented commander during his service. In February 1944, he was appointed commander of the 5th Guards Mine Torpedo Aviation Regiment. During his command of the regiment, the pilots flew 688 sorties during which they sank 12 transport ships, 4 self-propelled barges, 2 minesweepers and 5 landing barges, and damaged 6 transports and set 358 naval mines.

He took part in the 1941 bombing raids on Romania and in the defense of Sevastopol. He later participated in the defensive and offensive stages of the battle for the Caucasus, and in the Crimean and Second Jassy–Kishinev offensives. During the second Jassy–Kishinev offensive in August 1944, the pilots of the regiment successfully completed the task of blocking the main Romanian naval port of Constanța. As a result, the enemy forces were unable to wipe the naval mines set by the naval pilots and almost all the ships in the base were captured by the Soviet troops.

From 1942 to 1944, Burkin flew 88 sorties on an Ilyushin Il-4, including 17 night-time sorties. In one of the sorties, the gunner of his aircraft shot down a German fighter.

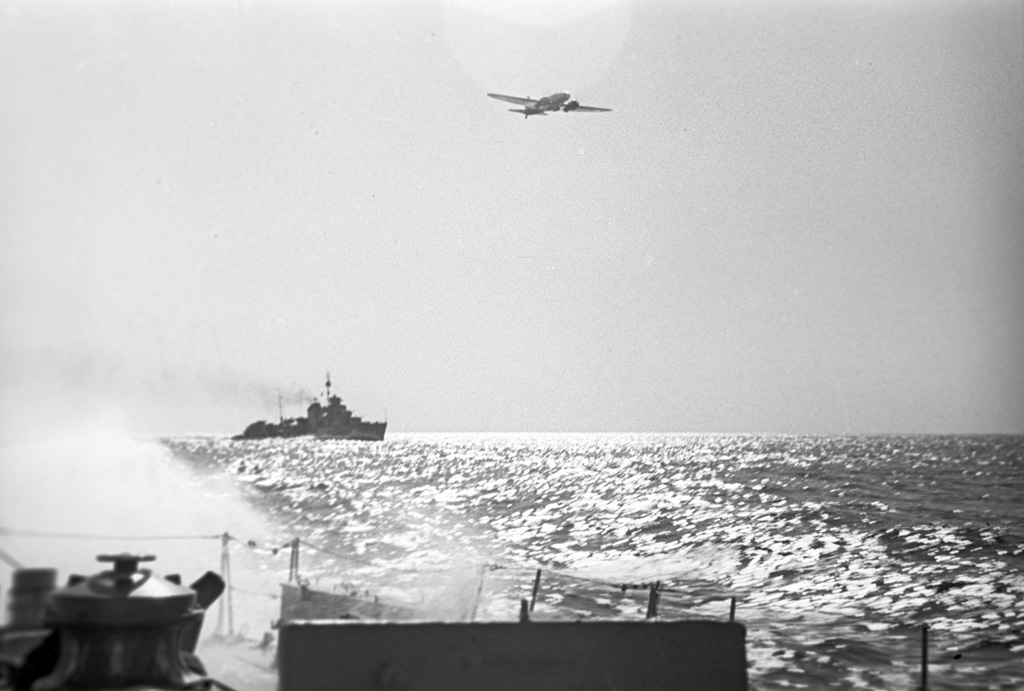
Il-4 during a combat mission with the Pacific Fleet (1945)

In September 1944, following the end of hostilities in the Black Sea, Burkin was reassigned to the Pacific Fleet in November 1944. He was assigned as the commander of the 52nd Mine-Torpedo Aviation Regiment of the Air Force of the Pacific Fleet. In August 1945, he took part in Operation August Storm in the Far East. As commander of the 52nd Mine-Torpedo Aviation Regiment, Burkin showed exceptional courage and military skill while flying the Il-4s. The regiment under his command from 9 August to 22 August 1945 made 138 sorties where they destroyed 2 transports, an industrial plant and port facilities at the cities of Seishin and Rajin-guyok, which are located at the northern portion of the Korean Peninsula. They also successfully disabled a railway bridge during their attacks. The regiment flew 527 hours and suffered no combat or emergency losses. Burkin flew two sorties, where he led the attacks on Seishin and Rajin-guyok.

By the decree of the Presidium of the Supreme Soviet of the USSR of September 14, 1945, Lieutenant Colonel Burkin was awarded the title of Hero of the Soviet Union.

== Post war ==
After the war, he continued his military service. From May 1946 to January 1948, he served as commander of the 2nd Mine-Torpedo Aviation Division of the Air Force of the Pacific Fleet. In 1949, he graduated from the Higher Military Academy named after K. E. Voroshilov.

From February 1950 to July 1951, he was assigned as commander of the 2nd Guards Mine-Torpedo Aviation Sevastopol Division named after N. Tokarev of the Air Force of the Black Sea Fleet. From July 1951 to February 1955, he was appointed as assistant commander of the Air Force of the Baltic Sea Fleet. From February 1955 to April 1955, he was the head of the 94th Naval Aviation School for Pilots of Initial Training. From April 1955 to December 1958, he served as the head of the 12th Naval Aviation School in the city of Kuybyshev (renamed Samara). From December 1958, he was in reserves.

Burkin lived in Samara after his retirement. For almost 20 years, he was the chairman of the Samara regional committee of war veterans. He died on 10 January 2001 and was buried at the Alley of Heroes section of the city cemetery in Samara.

== Awards and honors ==
USSR and Russia

Hero of the Soviet Union (14 September 1945)
Order of Lenin, twice (18 February 1942, 14 September 1945)
Order of the Red Banner, four times (8 December 1941, 13 May 1944, 28 August 1945, 1956)
Order of Alexander Nevsky (30 April 1944)
Order of the Patriotic War, 1st class, twice (15 December 1944, 11 March 1985)
Order of the Red Star (1950)
Medal "For Battle Merit" (10 November 1945)
Medal of Zhukov (1994)
Medal "For the Defence of Sevastopol" (1942)
Medal "For the Defence of the Caucasus" (1944)
Medal "For the Victory over Germany in the Great Patriotic War 1941–1945" (1945)
Medal "For the Victory over Japan" (1945)

- jubilee medals

Foreign

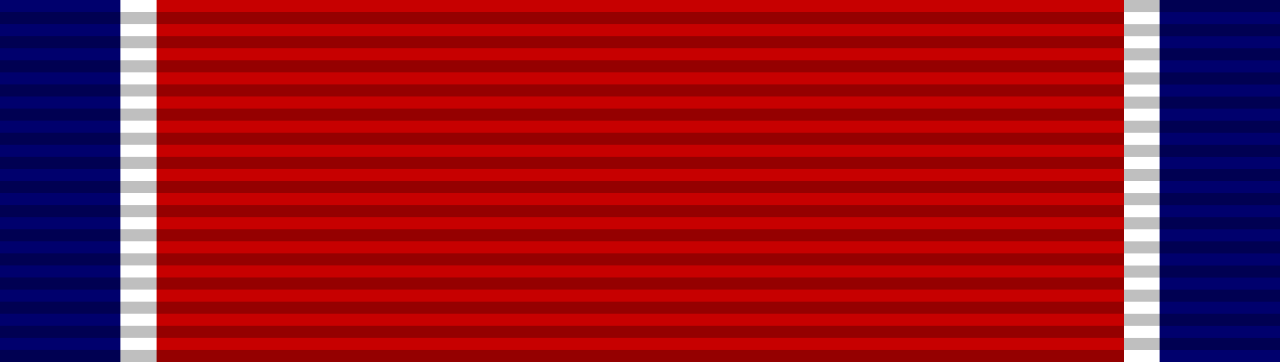
Order of the National Flag, 3rd class (North Korea)
Medal for the Liberation of Korea (North Korea)

=== Memorials and commemorations ===
- Honorary citizen of Samara
- In the city of Samara, a secondary school was named in his honor. In 2016, a memorial plaque honoring him was installed on the school building.
- A bust honoring him was installed on the Alley of Heroes section in front of the headquarters of the 7060th Naval Aviation Air Base of the Pacific Fleet at Yelizovo, Kamchatka Krai.
- In the city of Tula, a memorial plaque honoring him was installed at the monument to the Heroes of the Soviet Union.
