= Abu Salma =

Palestinian poet

عبد الكريم الكرمي Abdul-Karim al-Karmi
- عبد الكريم سعيد علي منصور الكرمي
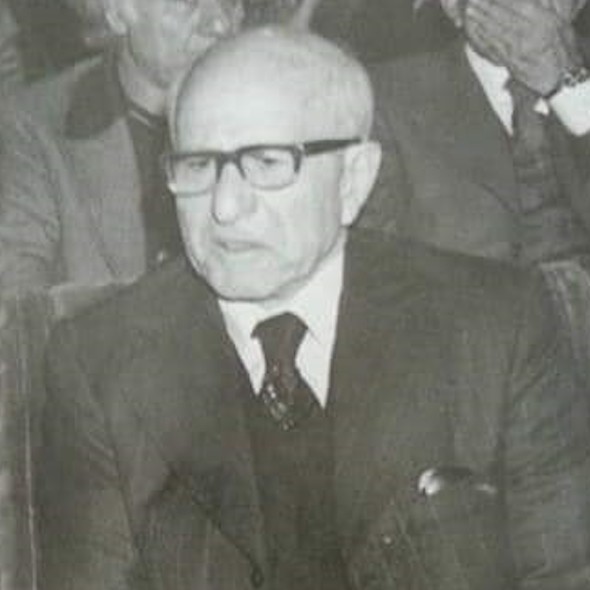
- Abu Salma
- Born: Abdul-Karim Sa'id Ali Mansour al-Karmi; 1909; Tulkarm, Ottoman Empire
- Died: 11 October 1980 (aged 70–71); Washington, D.C., U.S.
- Citizenship: (Palestine) Palestinian
- Occupations: Poet; Writer; Politician
- Relatives: Mahmoud Al-Karmi (brother); Hasan Karmi (brother); Abdul-Ghani Al-Karmi (brother); Ahmad Shakir al-Karmi (brother); Sa'id Ali al-Karmi (father)
- Writing career
- Language: Arabic; English
- Years active: 1927–1980
- Genre: Poetry
- Subject: Poetry
- Notable awards: Lotus International Reward for Literature (1978); Order of Palestinian revolution (1980); Order of Jerusalem for Culture, Arts and Literature (1990); Order of Palestine for Culture, Science and Arts (2015)

Abd al-Karim al-Karmi (Arabic: عبد الكريم الكرمي), (1909–11 October 1980), known as Abu Salma (أبو سلمى), was a famous Palestinian Arab poet. He was born in Tulkarm and was a member of the Palestine Liberation Organization. He was the recipient of several awards and was chairman of the General Union of Palestinian Writers and Journalists until his death.

== Biography ==
Abu Salma was born in 1909 in Tulkarm. He studied law and worked in Haifa in Mandatory Palestine until April 1948. He then moved briefly to Acre and then to Damascus. He also worked briefly for Palestine Broadcasting Service (PBS).

He was a participant in the 1936–1939 Arab revolt in Palestine, and his verses about the revolt circulated in the local press as well as orally among Palestinians.

He is the brother of Hasan Karmi, Mahmoud Al-Karmi and Abdul-Ghani Al-Karmi.

== Works ==
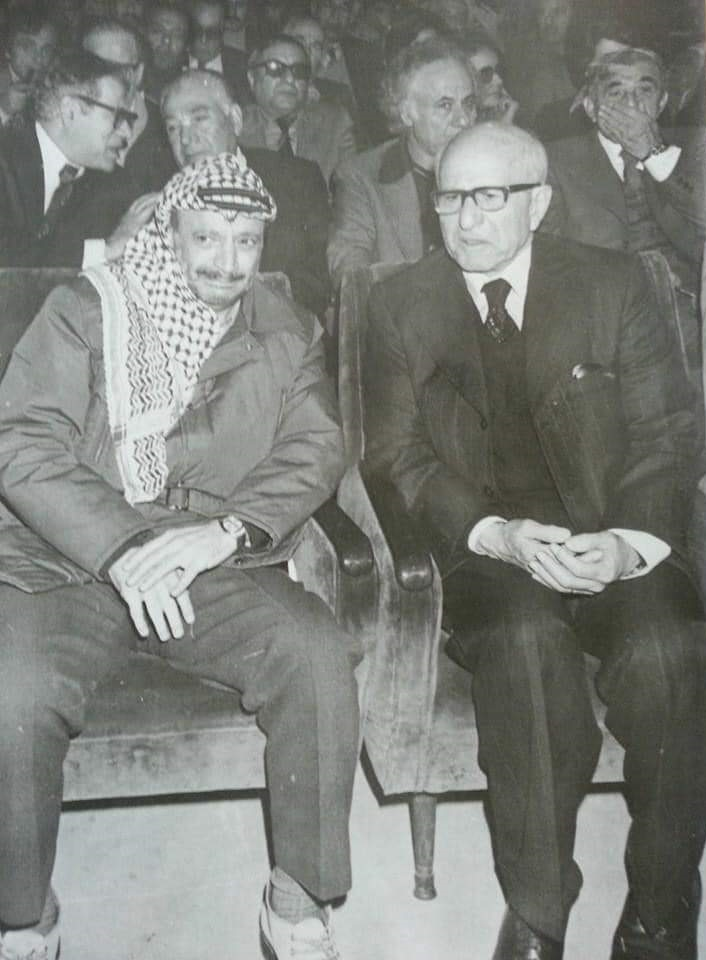
Abu Salma and Yasser Arafat

Poetry

- The Exile, 1953.
- Songs of My Country, 1959.
- Children's Songs, 1964.
- My Brush Is from Palestine, 1971.
- Collected Works, 1978.

Prose

- The Struggle of the Arabs of Palestine, 1964.
- The Works of Ahmad Shakir al-Karmi: Literary, Critical and Fictional, 1964.
- Shaykh Sa‘id al-Karmi, 1973.

== Death ==
He died of sepsis on 11 October 1980 in George Washington University Hospital in Washington, D.C.

== Awards and honors ==
- 1978: Lotus International Reward for Literature, by The Association of Asian and African Writers, it was given by the president of Angola Agostinho Neto for him.
- 1980: Order of Palestinian revolution, by the president of the Palestine Liberation Organization Yasser Arafat.
- 1990: Order of Jerusalem for Culture, Arts and Literature, by the president of the Palestine Liberation Organization Yasser Arafat.
- 2015: Order of Palestine for Culture, Science and Arts, by the president of the State of Palestine Mahmoud Abbas.
