= Tulkarm =

Palestinian city in the West Bank

Coordinates: 32°18′45″N 35°1′36″E

Tulkarm طولكرم
- Municipality type A (City)

Arabic transcription(s)
  - Arabic: طولكرم
  - Latin: Tulkarem (official); Tul Karem (unofficial)
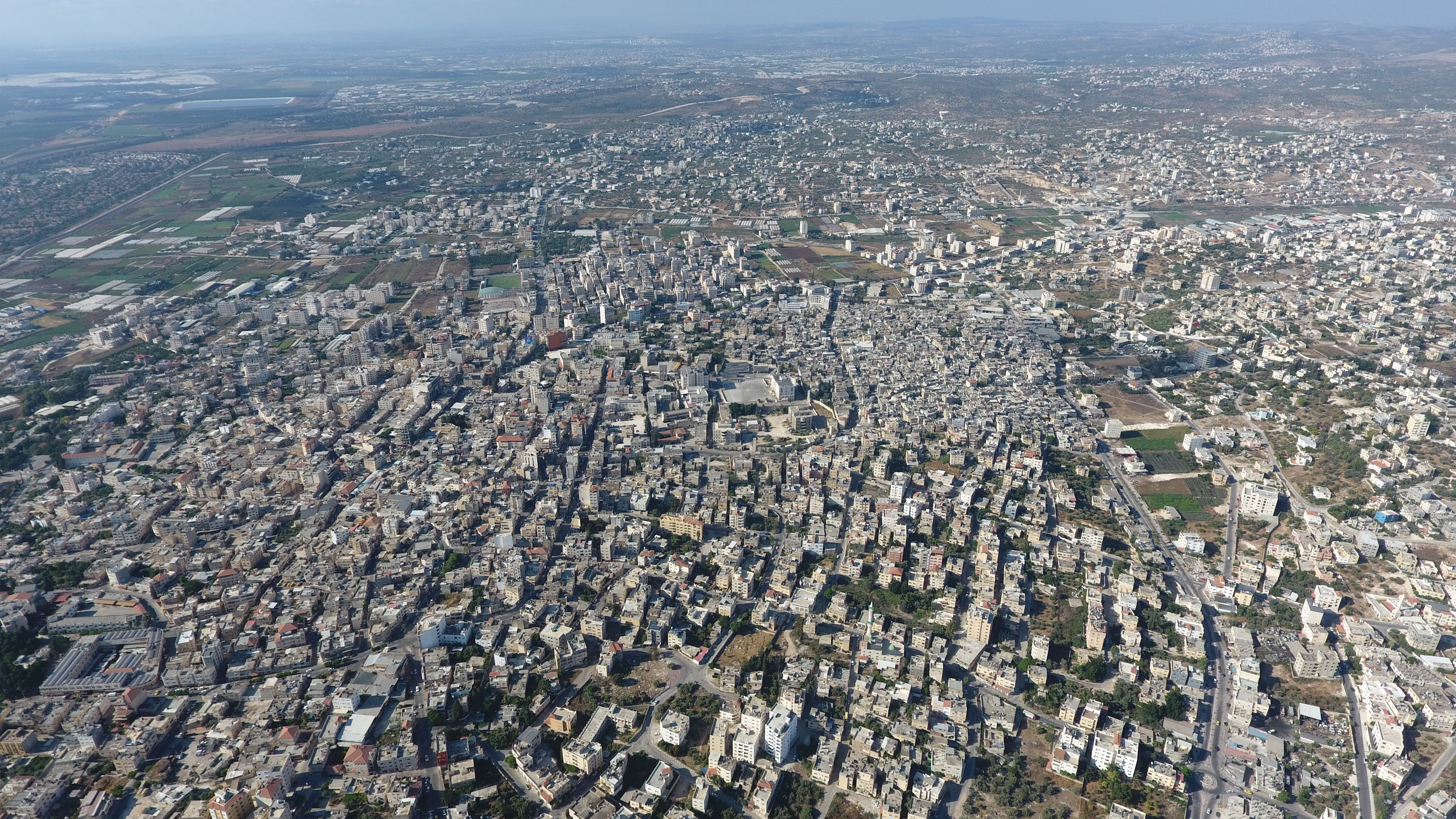
- Tulkarm, 2020

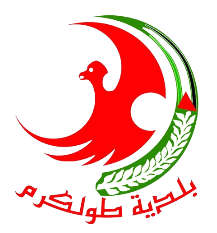
- Municipal Seal of Tulkarm
- Interactive map of Tulkarm
- Location of Tulkarm within Palestine
- Palestine grid: 152/190
- State: State of Palestine
- Governorate: Tulkarm
- Founded: Late 12th century

Government
  - Type: City
  - Head of Municipality: Riyad Awad (17 April 2022–)

Area
  - Total: 28.8 km^{2} (11.1 sq mi)

Population (2017)
  - Total: 64,532
  - Density: 2,240/km^{2} (5,800/sq mi)
- Name meaning: The long (place) of the vineyard.
- Website: www.tulkarm.org

Tulkarm or Tulkarem (Arabic: طولكرم, romanized: Ṭūlkaram) is a city in the West Bank, Palestine and the capital of the Tulkarm Governorate. Netanya is to the west in Israel, while Nablus and Jenin are to the east. According to the Palestinian Central Bureau of Statistics, in 2017 Tulkarm had a population of 64,532. Tulkarm is under the administration of the Palestinian National Authority.

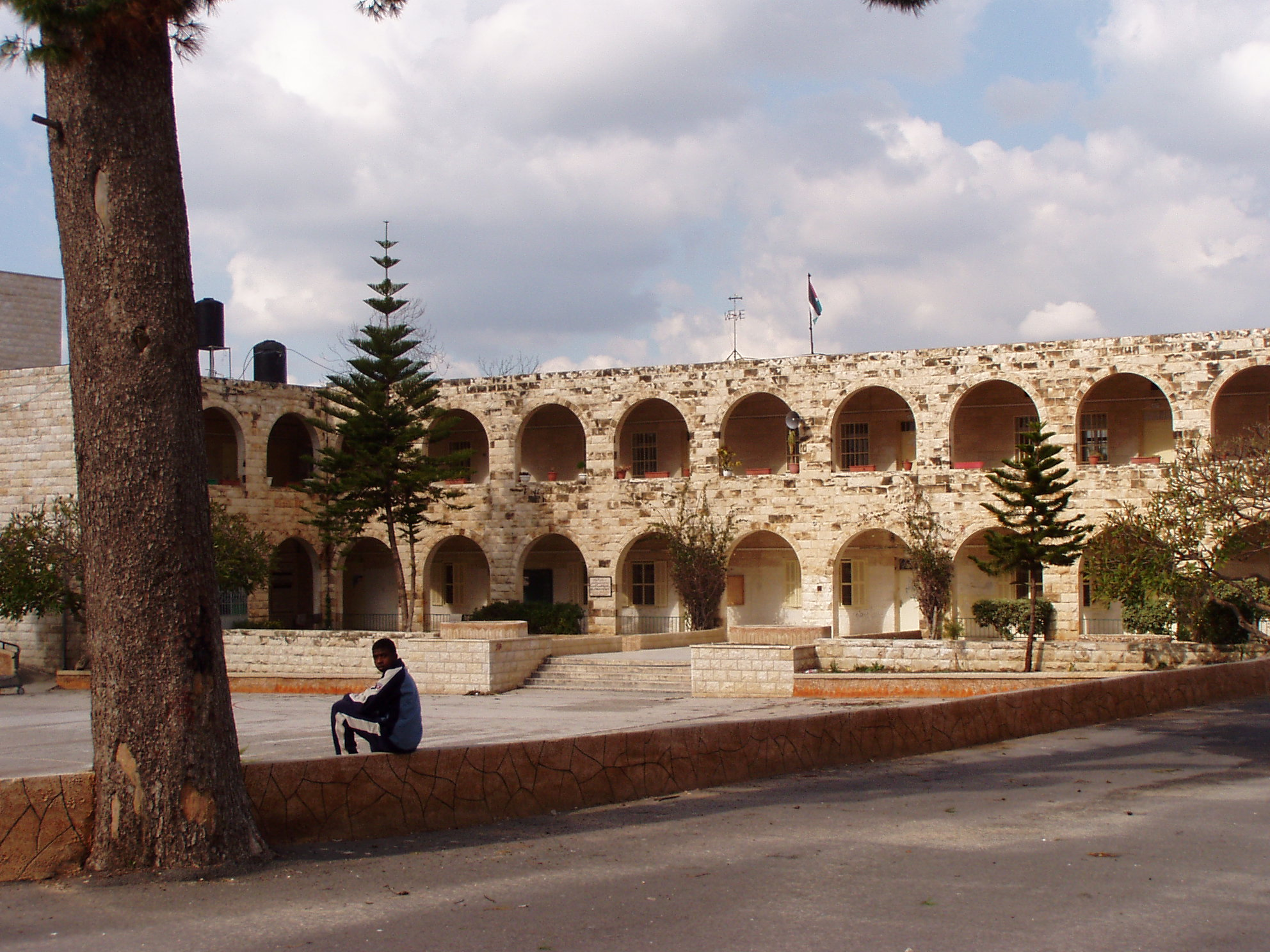
Al-Adawiah High School

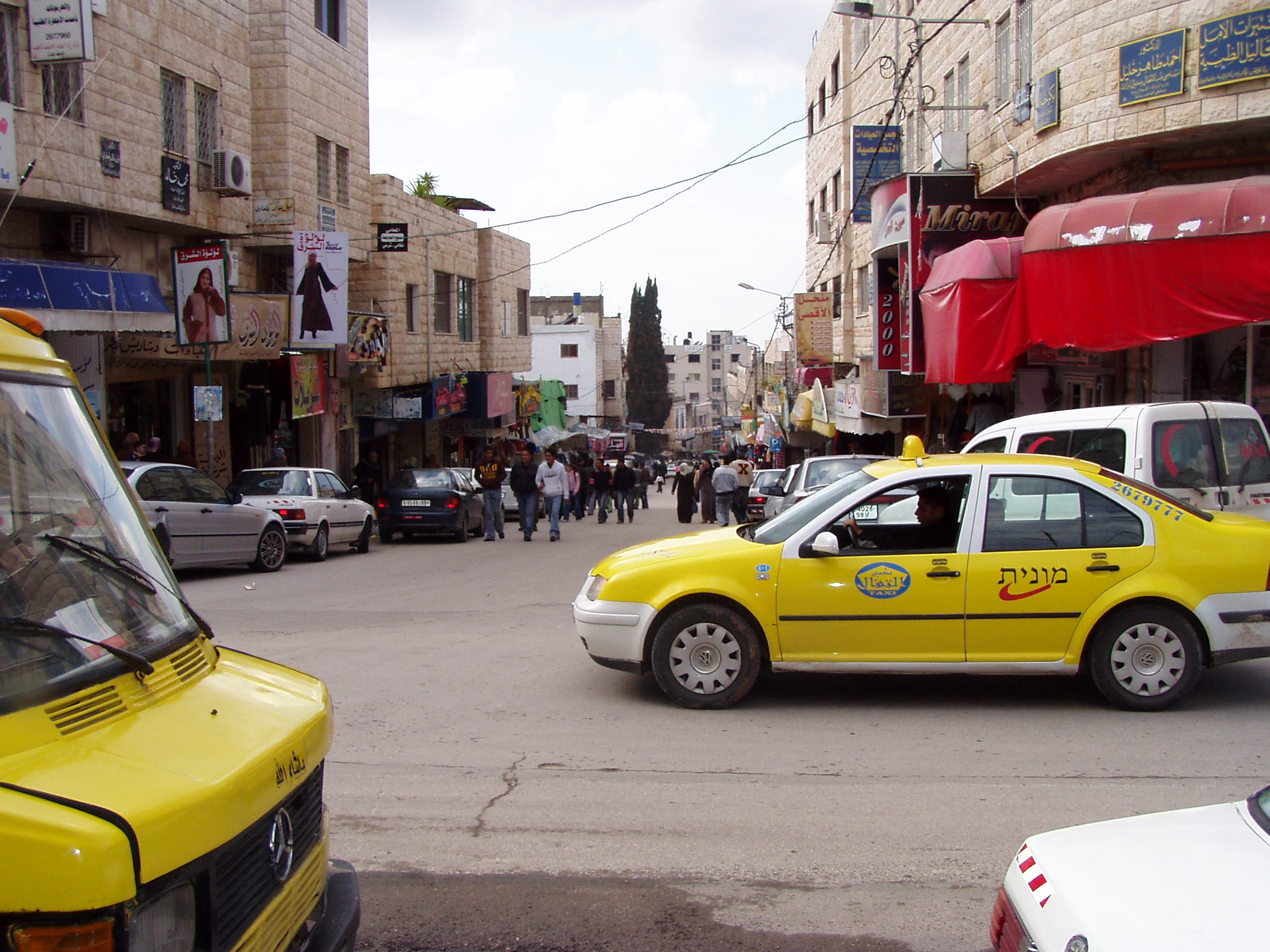
Paris Street, Tulkarm, 2007.

== Etymology ==
The Arabic name translates as 'length of vineyard' but is a distortion of the Aramaic name Tur Karma ('mount of the vineyard'), which was used for Tulkarm by the Crusaders and by the mediaeval Samaritan inhabitants.

== History ==
Benjamin Mazar identified Tulkarm with the toponym Birat Seriqa (בירת סריקא, lit. 'Saracen tower' or 'vineyard tower'), mentioned in the Talmud (b. AZ 31a; y. AZ 5:4) as located near the Samaritan town of Burgata (בורגתא/ברקתא, perhaps from burgus, 'tower'), which may be modern Burj al-Atut. However, Félix-Marie Abel put Birat Seriqa closer to Kafr Qallil, and others put it near Qalqilya. Isaiah Press and Dov Zudkevitz suggest the true site may be somewhat west of Tulkarm, at Tel Zureiqiya in the Poleg basin.

=== Ayyubid and Mamluk periods ===
During the Ayyubid era, after the Muslim reconquest of Palestine under Sultan Saladin in 1187, the first families to settle in Tulkarm were from the Kurdish clan of Zaydan. A military group, the Zaydan were dispatched to the Wadi al-Sha'ir area, which includes Tulkarm, by Saladin to buttress the defense of the western approaches of Muslim-held Palestine from the Crusaders who dominated the coastal area.

The Zaydan politically dominated Tulkarm and the vicinity until the early 17th century. Around 1230, during the late Ayyubid period, a group of Arabs from southern Palestine immigrated to Tulkarm. They had originally migrated to Palestine from Arabia many generations prior and had become semi-nomadic farmers and grazers. Among the Arab families were the Fuqaha clan, who were considered ashraf (related to the Islamic prophet Muhammad) and served as the ulama (religious scholars) of the village.

During the Ayyubid, and later the Mamluk era (1260–1517), the majority of Tulkarm's lands were made part of a waqf (religious trust) to support the al-Farisiyya Madrasa, an Islamic religious school in Jerusalem, located north of the Masjid Al-Aqsa compound. Two-thirds of the village's farmlands were confirmed as part of this trust in 1354 by the deputy-governor of Damascus, Faris al-Din al-Baki. During Mamluk rule another wave of Arab immigrants arrived in Tulkarm from North Africa and nearby Nablus. They largely engaged in agriculture and animal husbandry, supplying hides to leather merchants in the coastal villages, retaken from the Crusaders in the second half of the 13th century.

=== Ottoman era ===
Tulkarm was incorporated into the Ottoman Empire in 1517. Afterward, Sultan Suleiman the Magnificent (r. 1520–66) transferred Tulkarm's waqf to the al-Jawhariyya Madrasa (Commons), located in the Muslim Quarter, northwest of the al-Aqsa Mosque. Under this arrangement, Tulkarm's inhabitants paid a third of their harvest as a tax towards the waqf, called qasm. At the time of the waqf's reassignment, the population of the village was estimated at 522 (95 households) and the qasm consisted of eight carats of wheat and three carats of barley. The town's elite families administered the trust, which enabled them to reach higher social and economic status. The population increased through intermarriage with families fleeing violent feuds between the various clans of Jabal Nablus. By 1548, the population had grown to 189 households or roughly 1,040 persons.

Tulkarm appeared in Ottoman tax registers in 1596 as being in the nahiya (subdistrict) of Qaqun, which was a part of the sanjak (district) of Nablus. The largest village in the nahiya, Tulkarm had a population of 176 Muslim households (roughly 968 persons) and paid taxes on wheat, barley, summer crops, olives, goats, beehives and a press for olives or grapes. During this early period of Ottoman rule, there were five neighborhoods (pl. harat) centered around the Shaykh Ali al-Jazri al-Mughrabi Mosque, today referred to simply as the "Old Mosque". The population was overwhelmingly Sunni Muslim, and most residents were fellahin (peasants who worked the land.) The elite families during that time were the Zaydan and the Lajjun-based Tarabay, the latter belonging to the Bani Harith tribe. Because of the decentralized nature of the Ottoman state, these families and their successors in later centuries ruled the area with a high degree of autonomy. The Zaydan had particular authority over Tulkarm, being appointed as the mutassalim (tax collectors or enforcers) on behalf of the central authorities.

In the mid-17th-century most members of the Zaydan family, with the exception of the children and the elderly, were killed in a massacre by Tulkarm's inhabitants during Friday prayers. This was in reaction to the Zaydan having forced Tulkarm's residents to harvest and process the village's grains for taxation purposes. Consequently, political power in Tulkarm passed to the Badran clan, while the Fuqaha family took control of administering the "waqf" lands, firmly establishing them as the village's religious leaders. The Fuqaha had derived much of their authority from their classification as ashraf and their association with the Sufi Rifa'iyya zawiya of the village. The western neighborhood was mostly emptied of Zaydan members and would serve as the main area of settlement for newcomers.

Tulkarm appears on sheet 45 of Pierre Jacotin's map drawn up during Napoleon's invasion in 1799, named Toun Karin.

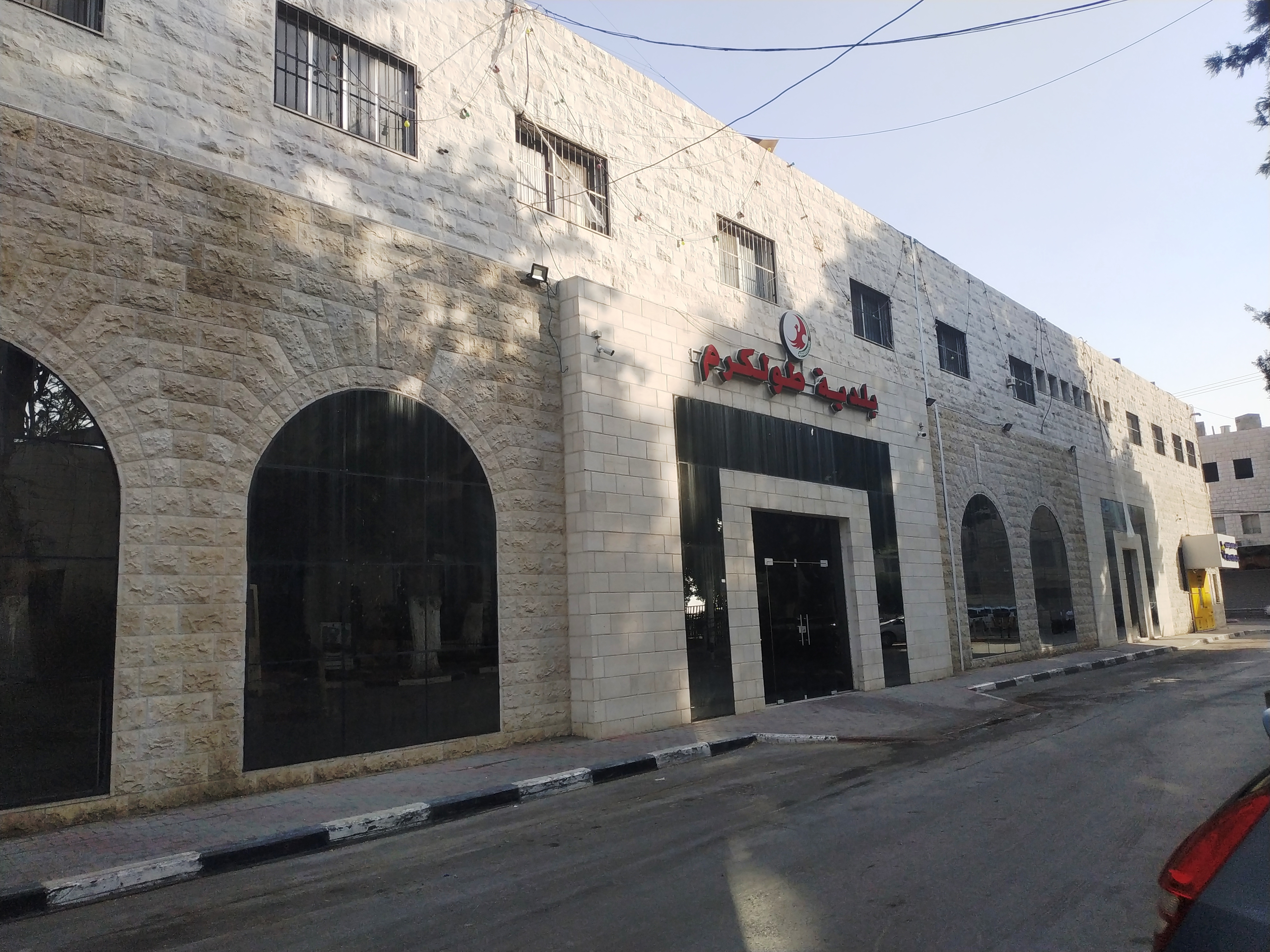
Tulkarm Municipality building

Following the adoption of the Ottoman Land Code in 1858, the musha (collective landownership) system was gradually abrogated and residents were required to register their property with the central authorities. The fellahin were wary of registering their names for fear of military conscription by the Ottoman state and instead entrusted various elite clans with the role of landlords, who were in effect absentee owners. This altered the area's social structure, with the Samara, al-Hajj Ibrahim and Hanun clans legally obtaining vast swathes of Tulkarm's lands. Leadership of the town's two main religious establishments were generally supplied by the Kur-based Jayyusi clan and the al-Barqawi clan of Shufa. The Barqawi clan controlled the area around the town in the 19th century.

The 1860s French explorer Victor Guérin visited Tulkarm, which he described as being of "considerable" size, with about 1,000 inhabitants. During this time, the Ottoman authorities granted the village an agricultural plot of land called Ghabat Tulkarm in the former confines of the Forest of Arsur (Ar. Al-Ghaba) in the coastal plain, west of the village.

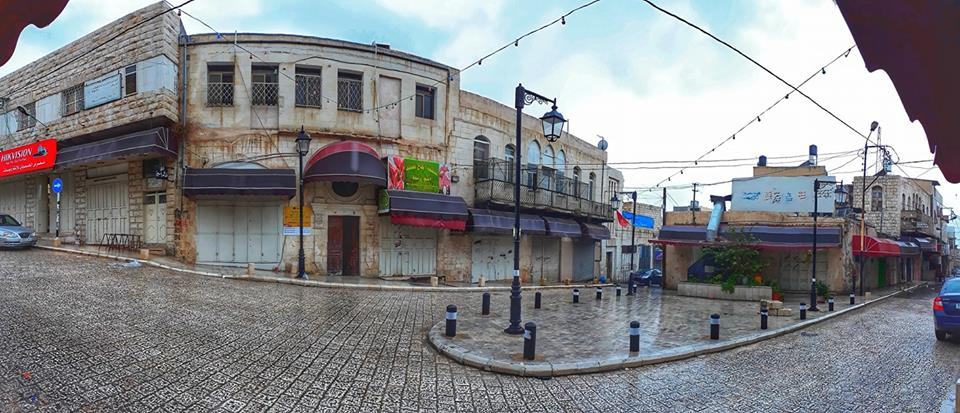
Old City of Tulkarm

The Survey of Western Palestine in 1882 described Tulkarm as a "long straggling village, on high ground", surrounded by arable land and rock. There were several "good-sized" houses, mainly of stone in the village.

Tulkarm became the administrative center of a new subdistrict (qada') Bani Saʿb-Tulkarm in 1876, later becoming a municipality in 1892. Tulkarm was also appointed a governor, bringing the residents who numbered only a few thousand and who were mostly fellahin, closer to the central government. This elevated status gave Tulkarm precedence over the nearby villages, which at that time also included Qalqilya. Tulkarm's center shifted from the Old Mosque to an empty space in the northwest as the town expanded northward with the construction of government buildings, a post office, a school and a hospital in that area.

Around the turn of the 20th century, Tulkarm was one of the villages in which the Hannun family owned extensive estates. The Hannuns fostered close ties with clans in the village.

Tulkarm became a major rail junction in 1908 on the Hejaz Railway line running up from Egypt and southern Palestine to Haifa and Acre in the northwest, Jerusalem, Nablus and Ramallah to the south, Lebanon to the north, and Syria and Transjordan to the east. The Ottoman Army used Tulkarm as one of its principal bases during the Sinai and Palestine campaign in World War I. It was bombed by British planes carried by HMS Anne. It was captured by British forces in 1918.

=== British Mandate era ===
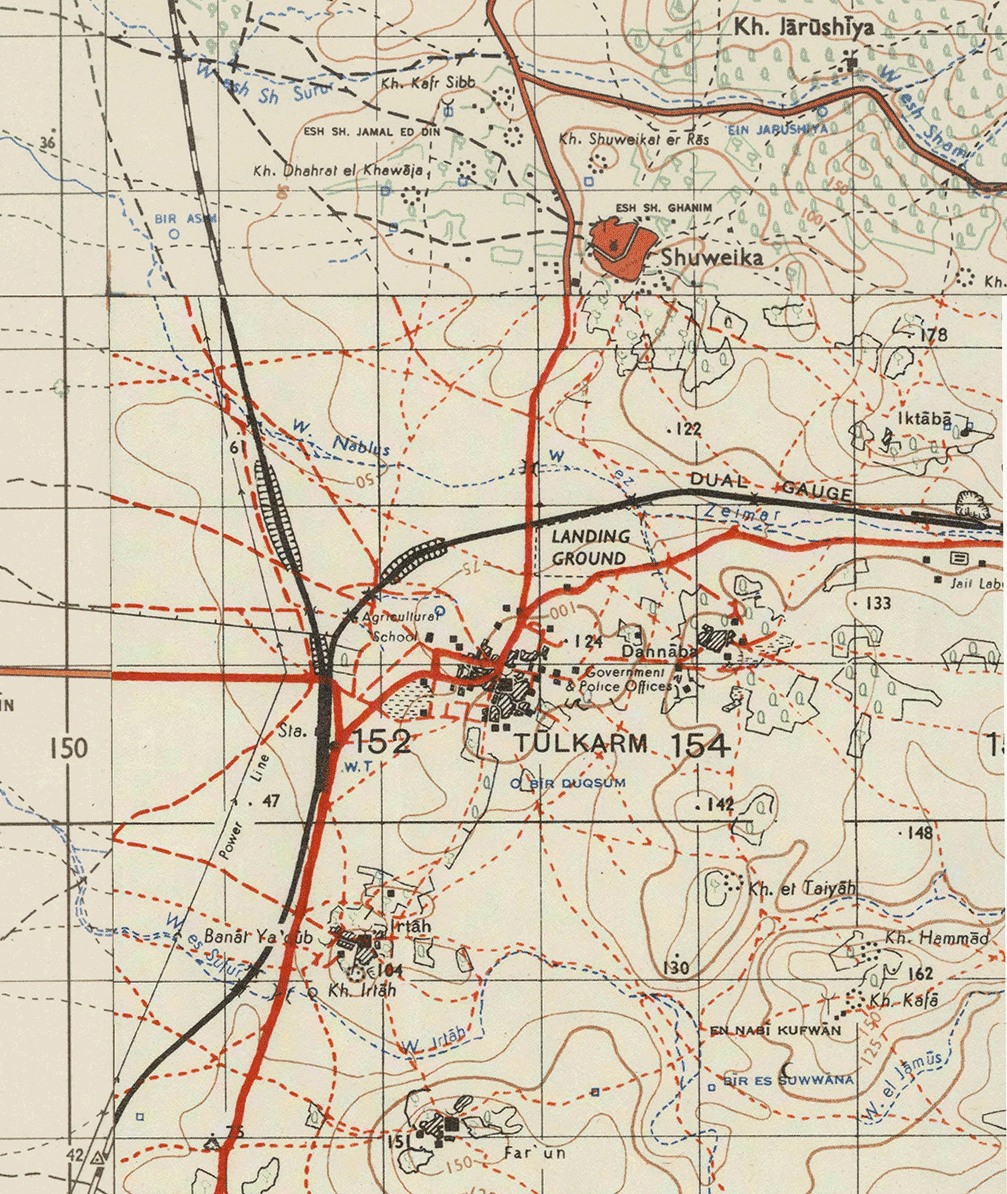
The region of Tulkarm in the 1940s.

The British Mandatory administration (1942–1947) in Palestine designated Tulkarm as the center of the Tulkarm Subdistrict.

A road was constructed in 1920 to connect the town with Netanya on the coast. In order to cope with a significant increase in population and unorganized infrastructural development, a civil planning scheme was designed for Tulkarm and its satellite villages in 1945. At the time Tulkarm was divided into four main sections, with the bulk of commercial activity concentrated along the north–south and east–west roads. Meanwhile, the town continued to expand past its northern fringes, which had previously been characterized by green spaces.

Tulkarm became a haven for Palestinian Arab rebel activity during the 1936–1939 Arab revolt in Palestine against British rule. General Commander of the Revolt Abd al-Rahim al-Hajj Muhammad hailed from Dhinnaba, today part of Tulkarm municipality, and led many operations in the region.

In the 1945 statistics the population of Tulkarm consisted of 8,090; of whom 7,790 were Muslims, 280 Christian and 20 "other", with a land area of 1,672 dunams (urban) and 32,610 dunams (rural), according to an official land and population survey. Of this, 2,399 dunams were designated for citrus and bananas, 276 plantations and irrigable land, 28,256 for cereals, while 1,492 dunams were built-up areas.

=== Jordanian rule ===
During the 1948 Arab–Israeli War, Tulkarm was occupied by the Iraqi Army and later annexed as part of the Jordanian-held West Bank. The 1949 Armistice Agreements between Israel and Jordan left roughly 30,000 dunams of Tulkarm's 32,610 dunams of land, mostly agricultural, in Israeli territory. In consequence, many residents moved to Transjordan or went abroad in search of employment. Straddling the armistice line, Tulkarm was cut off from nearby Arab towns. Its principal economic and social connection was with Nablus.

In 1950, the Tulkarm Camp was established by UNRWA in the city, comprising an area of 0.18 square kilometres (0.07 sq mi). Most of the refugees who resided in the camp came from Jaffa, Caesarea and Haifa. Today it is the second largest Palestinian refugee camp in the West Bank. A period of significant municipal expansion began in Tulkarm after a new civil development scheme was authorized in 1961. As part of this plan, in 1963, the hamlet of Jarrad in the southeast and other lands in the northeast (total of 1.8 square km) were annexed to the city, while the eastern village of Dhinnaba was incorporated into the municipality in 1964, adding another 0.75 square kilometres (0.29 sq mi) of territory. The village of Shuweika to the north and the smaller village of Irtah to the south were annexed in 1967.

=== Contemporary period ===
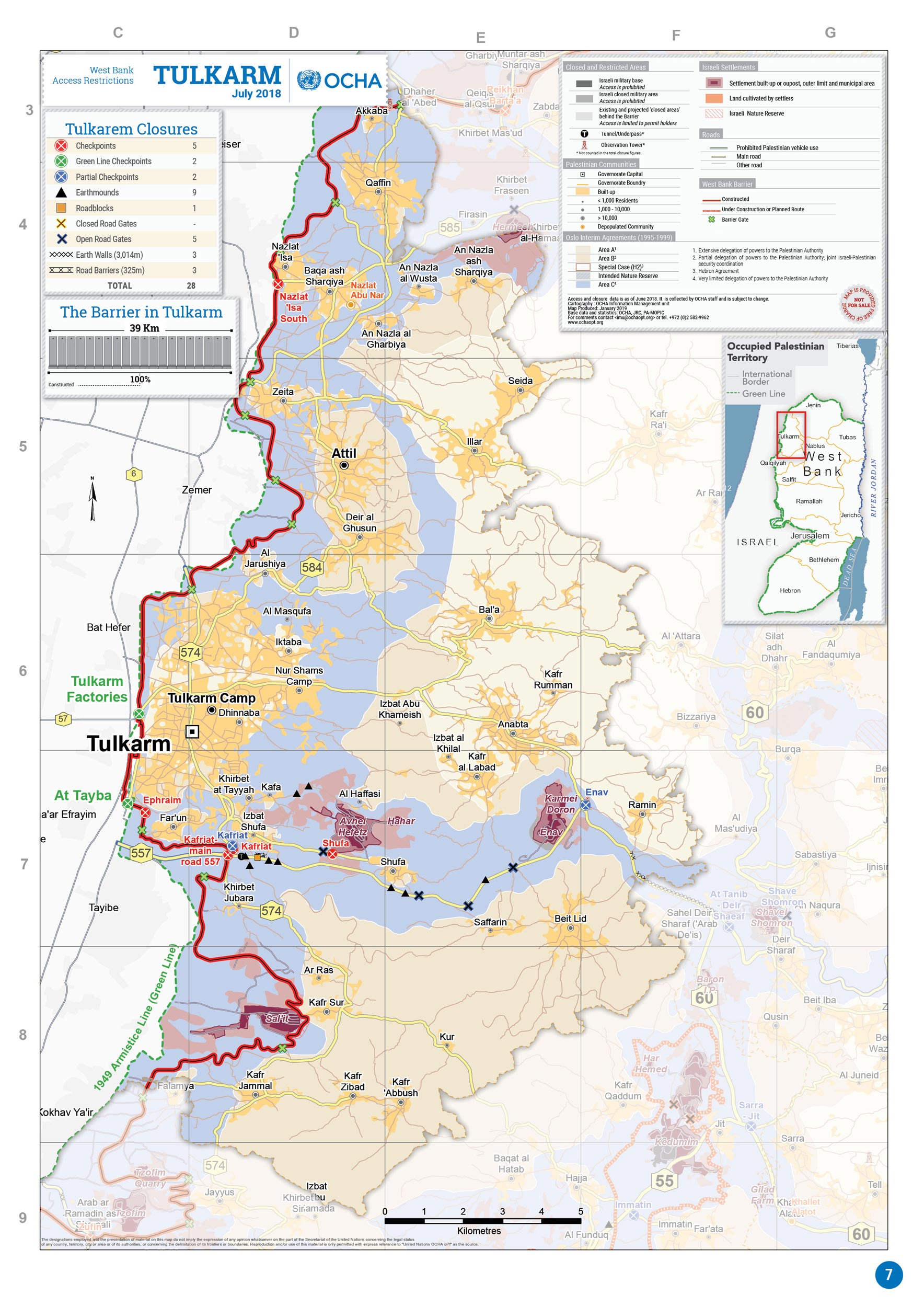
2018 United Nations map of the area, showing the Israeli occupation arrangements.

Since the Six-Day War in 1967, Tulkarm has been under Israeli occupation. A military government governed Tulkarm until transfer in 1982 to the Israeli Civil Administration.

During the early months of the First Intifada, 16 May 1989, Muhammad As'ad Fokhah, 50 years old, from Shuweika, died in Megiddo prison after a three-day hunger strike. Yitzhak Rabin reported to a Member of Knesset that Fokhah died of a heart attack caused by dehydration and that the military investigation found that prison staff had acted in accordance with orders.

In the wake of the 1993 Oslo Accords between Israel and the Palestine Liberation Organization (PLO), control of Tulkarm was transferred to the Palestinian National Authority (PNA) on 10 December 1995, becoming the third Palestinian city from which Israeli forces withdrew. During the early years of the Second Intifada, Israel temporarily reoccupied Tulkarm. Israeli military administration over Tulkarm ended in 2005, when control of the city was handed back to the PNA. Upon assuming control of the city, the PNA instituted new weapons restrictions limiting militants to a single registered weapon that may not be loaded or carried in public.

==== Gaza War ====
On 19 October 2023, the IDF entered the city. In August 2024, Israeli bulldozers destroyed miles of the city, including homes, businesses and infrastructure; Israeli soldiers blocked emergency responders from assisting residents. News reports include videos of this attack, as well as assertions by the Israel Defense Forces that it is rooting out terrorism; and that it "undertakes all feasible precautions to avoid damaging essential infrastructure," while acknowledging that these "operations in the area have caused unavoidable harm to certain civilian structures."

== Geography ==
The city is situated on the western edge of northern West Bank, about 15 kilometers (9.3 mi) west of Nablus further southwest of Jenin and 15 kilometers (9.3 mi) east of the Israeli coastal city of Netanya. It is bordered by the 1948 ceasefire line, with Israel's Central and Haifa Districts to the west, and Palestine's Qalqilya and Ramallah and al-Bireh Governorates to the south. Its central location between a plain and a mountain has made it commercially and strategically significant and has had a great impact on its growth. In the past, Tulkarm was a caravan station and a trading center for products from the city's surrounding villages and farms, as well as a point from which armies crossed to Egypt and the Levant (al-Sham).

Tulkarm is at the crossroads of three historically important arteries: A road which runs north from the Latrun area along the edge of the coastal plain to Mount Carmel, Mount Tabor, Mount Gilboa, Nazareth and the Galilee and the Golan Heights, a road which winds northward along the outer tier of hills from the Ajalon valley to the Jezreel Valley, and a road that rises from the Mediterranean Sea at modern-day Netanya east to Nablus. In the past it was a junction of the coastal railroad from north of Haifa to Cairo and a branch of the narrow gauge Hejaz railway to Damascus.

== Demographics ==
Historical population
Year	Pop.	±%
1548	1,040	—
1596	968	−6.9%
1860s	1,000	+3.3%
1922	3,350	+235.0%
1931	4,540	+35.5%
1938	5,700	+25.6%
1945	8,090	+41.9%
1961	11,401	+40.9%
1967	20,002	+75.4%
1997	39,805	+99.0%
2007	61,941	+55.6%
2017	64,532	+4.2%

According to the 1922 census of Palestine conducted by the British Mandate authorities, Tulkarm had a population of 3,350 (3,109 Muslims, 208 Christians, 23 Jews, eight Samaritans, one Baha'i, and one Druze). At the time of the 1931 census, Tulkarm had a population of 4,827 (4,540 Muslims, 255 Christians, 18 Jews, six Samaritans, and one Druze) with 541 in nearby suburbs (516 Muslims, 15 Jews, and 10 Christians).

The village statistics of 1938 list Tulkarm's population as 5,700 with 629 in nearby suburbs (including 17 Jews). The village statistics of 1945 list the population as 8,090 (7,790 Muslims, 280 Christians, and 20 "other").

The populations of Tulkarm, Dhinnaba, Shuweika and Irtah steadily increased by an average of 2% annually between 1931 and 1961, with a drastic increase after the 1948 War as the area experienced an influx of Palestinian refugees. The Jews presumably left/fled during the war. Following the 1967 War, the population saw a temporary decrease as some residents fled to Jordan. In the 1967 census by the Israel Central Bureau of Statistics the population of Tulkarm city was recorded as 10,255, Tulkarm Camp as 5,020, Dhinnaba as 1,342, Irtah as 925, Shuweika as 2,332 and Khirbet Jarrad as 128, a total of 20,002. Most of the inhabitants were Muslims, although there was a community of 103 Christians according to the census.

In the first census by the Palestinian Central Bureau of Statistics (PCBS) in 1997, Tulkarm had a population of 33,921 and the Tulkarm Refugee Camp had a population of 5,884. Palestinian refugees made up 31.4% of the city's residents and 94% of the camp's inhabitants. The sex ratio for the city was 50.7% male and 49.3% female. Over half (52.2%) of the city's population was under the age of 20, 44.5% were between the ages of 20 and 64 and 4.1% were over the age of 64. In the 2007 PCBS census Tulkarm's population grew to 51,300 while the camp's increased to 10,641. The sex ratio for the city was 50.3% male and 49.7% female.

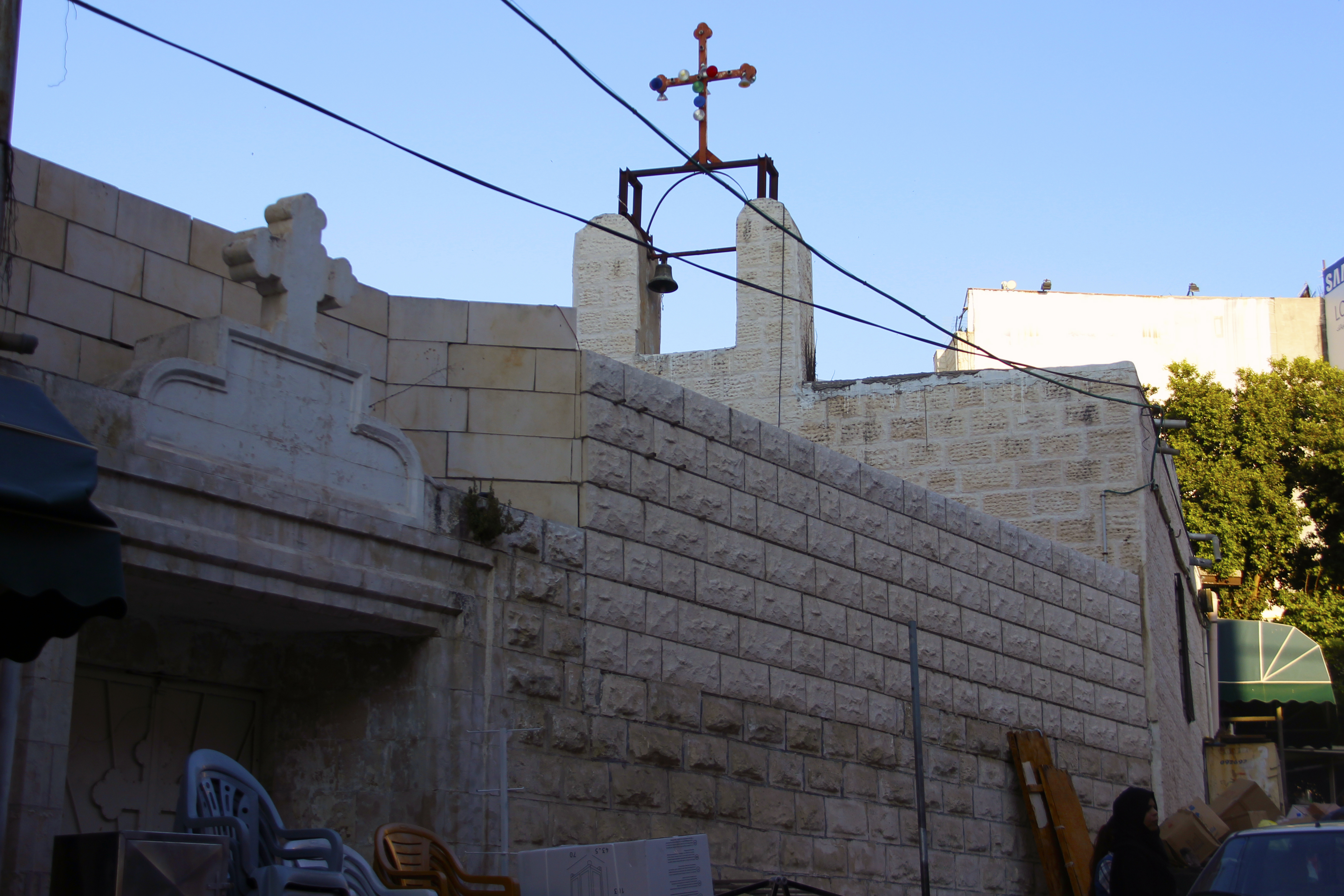
Church of Saint George, Tulkarm.

Today the population is almost entirely Muslim. During the British Mandate period, a Christian community of c. 250 members developed in Tulkarm, as a result of trade and work related migrations. By Israel's occupation of the city in 1967, an estimated 1,000 Christians were living in Tulkarm, but roughly half of the community emigrated in the aftermath of the war, while most of the remaining Christians gradually emigrated afterward. There are two Christian families who continue to live in Tulkarm, who are part of the same extended family. There is a Greek Orthodox church in the city dedicated to St. George, built in the early 19th century. The church is active and opens for visitors.

== Climate ==
The climate of Tulkarm is Mediterranean and subtropical as the area surrounding it, with rainfall limited to the winter. The average temperature in the winter ranges from 8 to 16 °C (46 to 61 °F), while the average temperature in the summer ranges from 17 to 30 °C (63 to 86 °F). Tulkarm is distinguished by the moderating effect the sea breeze has on its climate because of its location in the mountains. The average temperature does not exceed 27 °C (81 °F) in August, while February's average temperature does not fall below 13.5 °C (56 °F). Humidity is moderate in summer, about 40-70%, though it rises in winter to between 70 and 85%. Tulkarm receives in excess of 550 millimeters (22 in) of rain yearly, which is dispersed and intermittent, characteristic of the Mediterranean Basin.

Climate data for Tulkarm
Month	Jan	Feb	Mar	Apr	May	Jun	Jul	Aug	Sep	Oct	Nov	Dec	Year
Mean daily maximum °C (°F)	17.0 (62.6)	17.5 (63.5)	19.6 (67.3)	23.9 (75.0)	24.2 (75.6)	28.3 (82.9)	29.0 (84.2)	30.0 (86.0)	27.9 (82.2)	26.0 (78.8)	23.0 (73.4)	19.2 (66.6)	22.76 (72.97)
Mean daily minimum °C (°F)	8.9 (48.0)	8.7 (47.7)	10.5 (50.9)	13.6 (56.5)	17.2 (63.0)	20.6 (69.1)	23.0 (73.4)	23.6 (74.5)	20.7 (69.3)	18.5 (65.3)	14.1 (57.4)	10.9 (51.6)	15.54 (59.97)
Average precipitation mm (inches)	124.9 (4.92)	92.2 (3.63)	52.8 (2.08)	23.6 (0.93)	2.7 (0.11)	2.8 (0.11)	2.2 (0.09)	0.7 (0.03)	1.2 (0.05)	28.0 (1.10)	77.4 (3.05)	135.5 (5.33)	538.3 (21.19)
Average precipitation days	13.9	11.7	8.6	3.6	1.4	3.2	2.0	0.7	0.8	3.9	8.0	11.8	63.7
Source: Israel Meteorological Service

The rainy season starts in October and continues through May. Between December and February, almost 70% of annual rainfall occurs, while 20% of annual rainfall occurs in October and November. Rain in June and September is rare and comes to negligible amounts. July and August have no rain at all, except for one rainfall of 1.5 millimeters (0.059 in) on July 10, 1995, in Tulkarm city (Tulkarm Agricultural Department). The mean annual rainfall in the city of Tulkarm is 642 millimeters (25.3 in) for the period from 1952 to 1995 (Tulkarm Agricultural Department).

== Economy ==
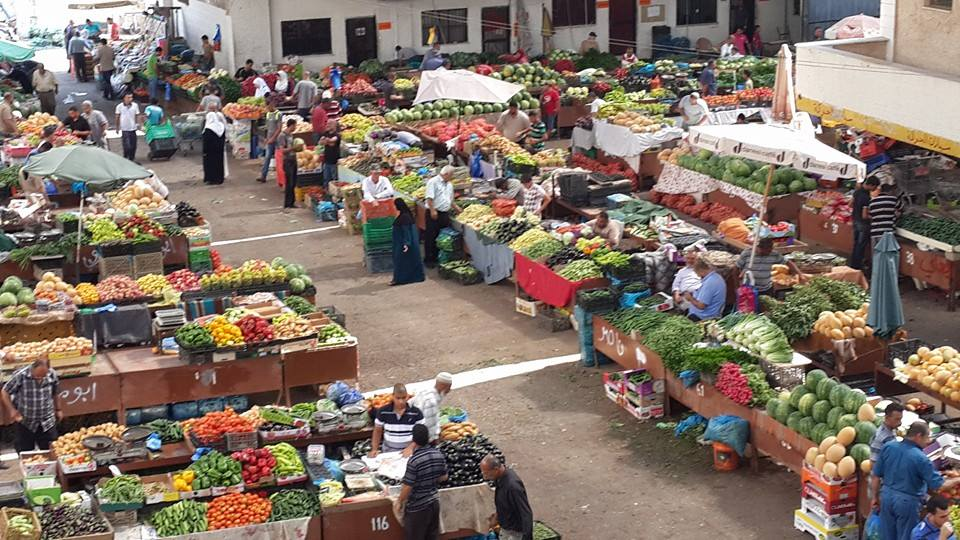
Market in Tulkarm

Prior to the 1948 War, Tulkarm had a major agricultural sector, with grain, olives and fruits, especially watermelons, being the major crops cultivated by in the town's lands.

== Education ==
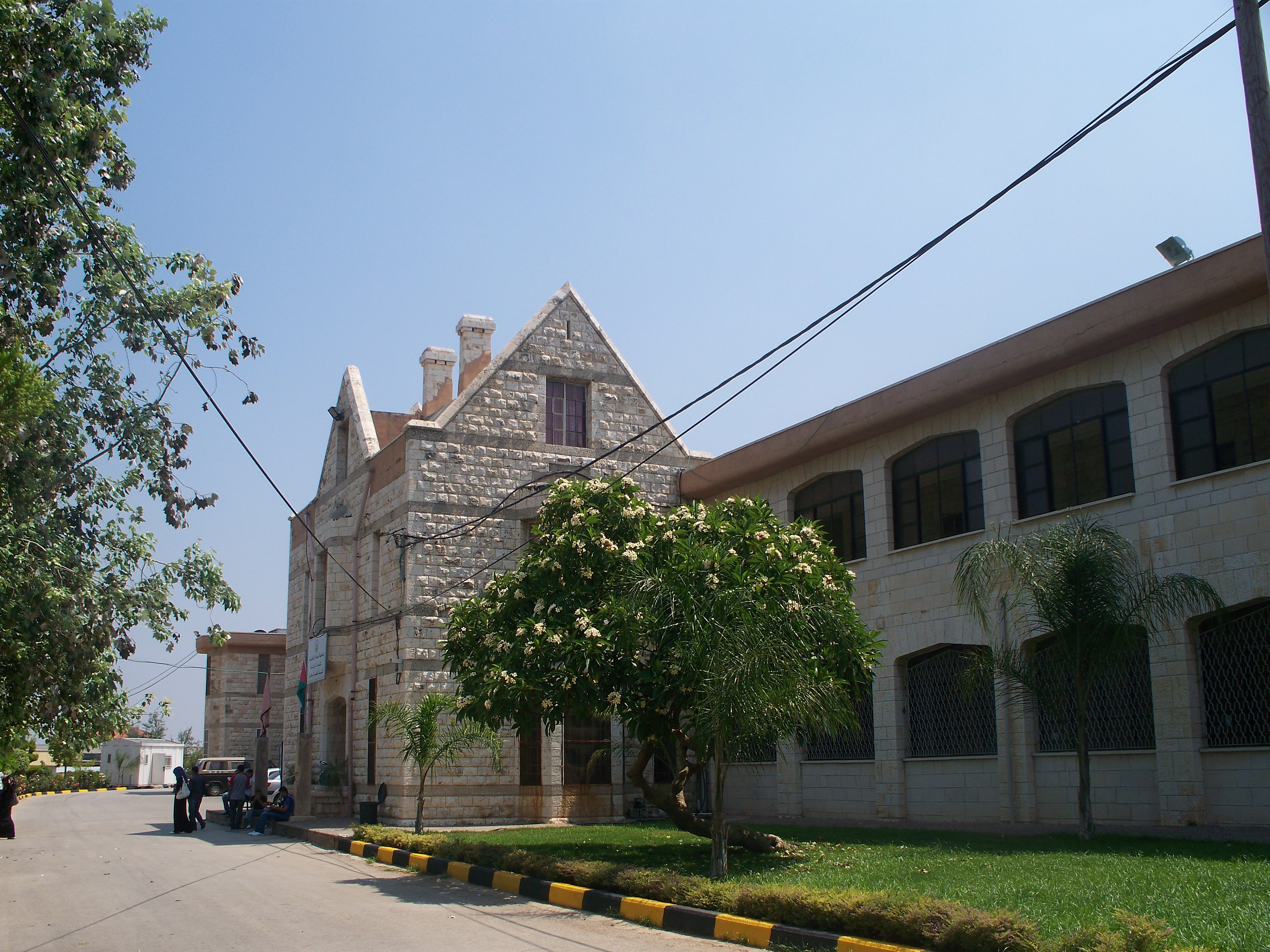
An-Najah National University (Tulkarm branch)

Palestinian Technical University - Kadoorie which is the sole governmental university in Palestine, was established as an agricultural college in Tulkarem during the British Mandate by an endowment from the Iraqi-born Jewish philanthropist J.S. Kadoorie in 1930 and then became a university in 2007. Other institutions of higher learning include Al-Quds Open University and two campuses of An-Najah National University.

There are seven high schools in Tulkarm, three for girls (al-Adawiah, Jamal Abd al-Nasser, and Al-Khawaja) and three for boys (al-Fadilia, Ihsan Samara, and Adnan Sefareni) and a vocational school for both genders.

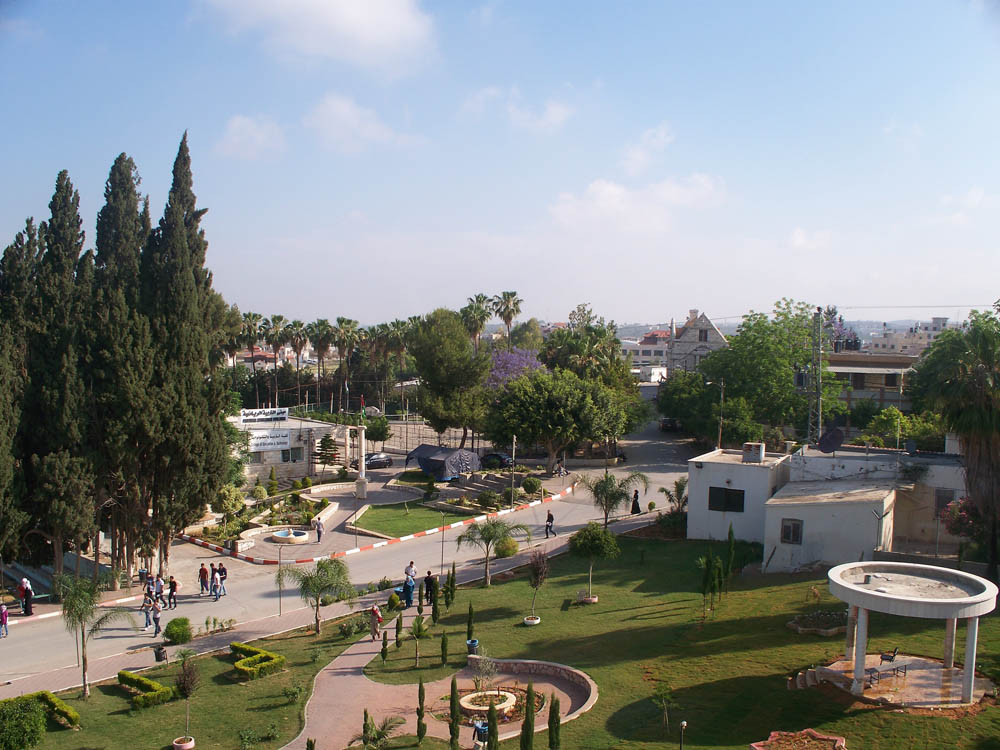
Palestine Technical University – Kadoorie

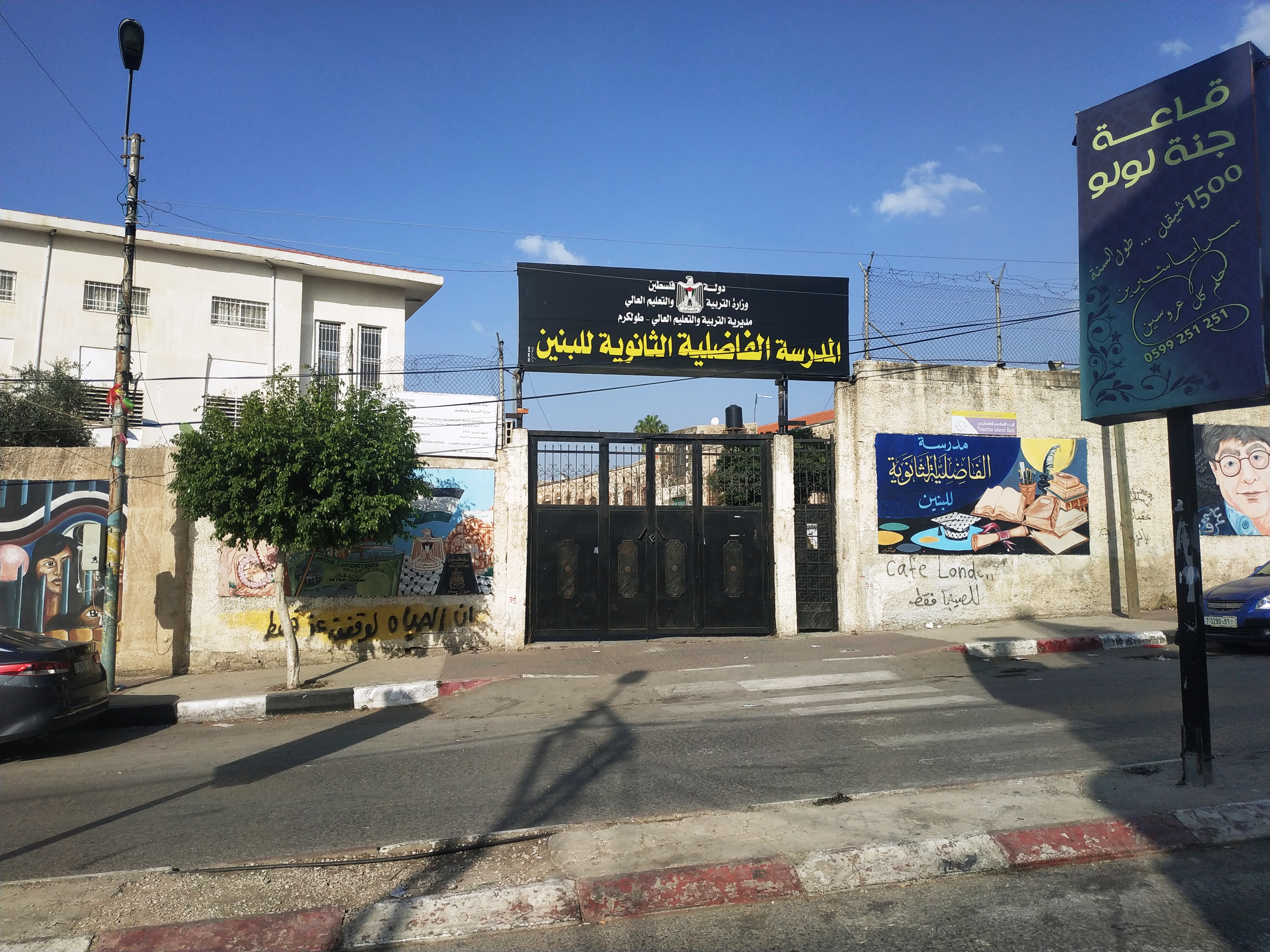
Fadhiliya School

On September 24, 2016, the PA named a school in Tulkarem after Salah Khalaf. Tulkarem governor Issam Abu Bakr said that the school was named after “martyr Salah Khalaf in order to commemorate the memory of this great national fighter”.

== Culture ==
The traditional costumes of women from Tulkarm were plain, dark-colored gowns with or without embroidery, as most rural women were from the north of Palestine. Today, embroidery is the main source of income for the women of the city. The most popular embroidered images are maps of historic Palestine. The Palestinian dish musakhan is popular in the city. Tulkarm shares many of its cultural features with neighboring Haifa, Jenin, Nablus, Qalqilia, and Jaffa.

A Tulkarm amusement park called Mega Land attracts tens of thousands of visitors on Muslim holidays.

== Sports ==
Tulkarm has 2 semi-professional soccer teams; Thaqafi Tulkarm and Markez Shabab Tulkarm. Both are in the Palestinian League Division One.

== Sister cities ==
Tulkarm's sister cities include:

- Cenon, France
- Nîmes, France
- Meknes, Morocco
- Santarém, Portugal

== Notable people ==
- Sanaa Alsarghali
- Abu Salma (1909–1980)
- Akram Al-Ashqar, film maker
- Ekrem Akurgal, Turkish archaeologist born in 1911 in Tulkarm
- Khaled Abu Toameh, Palestinian Israeli-Arab Muslim journalist
- Mar'i al-Karmi (1580–1624)
- Mahmoud Al-Karmi (1889–1939)
- Hasan Karmi (1905–2007)
- Abdul-Ghani Al-Karmi (1906–1974)
- Hilmi Hanoun (1913–2001), long-term mayor of Tulkarm
- Zuhair Al-Karmi (1921–2009)
- Ameen Nayfeh, film maker and writer
- Bassam Lotfi (1940–2022)
- Jamal Rayyan (1953–2026), news television anchorman
- Alaa Shreiteh (1979–2024)

== See also ==
- Tulkarm Brigade

== Bibliography ==
- Barron, J.B., ed. (1923). Palestine: Report and General Abstracts of the Census of 1922. Government of Palestine.
- Conder, C.R.; Kitchener, H.H. (1882). The Survey of Western Palestine: Memoirs of the Topography, Orography, Hydrography, and Archaeology. Vol. 2. London: Committee of the Palestine Exploration Fund.
- Doumani, B. (1995). Rediscovering Palestine, Merchants and Peasants in Jabal Nablus, 1700-1900. University of California Press.
- Fischbach, Michael R. (2005) [2000]. "Tulkarm". In Philip Mattar (ed.). Encyclopedia of the Palestinians (Revised ed.). New York: Facts on File, Inc. p. 494. ISBN 0-8160-5764-8.
- Government of Jordan, Department of Statistics (1964). First Census of Population and Housing. Volume I: Final Tables; General Characteristics of the Population (PDF).
- Government of Palestine, Department of Statistics (1945). Village Statistics, April, 1945.
- Guérin, V. (1875). Description Géographique Historique et Archéologique de la Palestine (in French). Vol. 2: Samarie, pt. 2. Paris: L'Imprimerie Nationale.
- Hadawi, S. (1970). Village Statistics of 1945: A Classification of Land and Area ownership in Palestine. Palestine Liberation Organization Research Center.
- Hütteroth, W.-D.; Abdulfattah, K. (1977). Historical Geography of Palestine, Transjordan and Southern Syria in the Late 16th Century. Erlanger Geographische Arbeiten, Sonderband 5. Erlangen, Germany: Vorstand der Fränkischen Geographischen Gesellschaft. ISBN 3-920405-41-2.
- Karmon, Y. (1960). "An Analysis of Jacotin's Map of Palestine" (PDF). Israel Exploration Journal. 10 (3, 4): 155–173, 244–253. Archived from the original (PDF) on 2019-12-22.
- Mills. E., ed. (1932). Census of Palestine 1931. Population of Villages, Towns and Administrative Areas. Jerusalem: Government of Palestine.
- Palmer, E.H. (1881). The Survey of Western Palestine: Arabic and English Name Lists Collected During the Survey by Lieutenants Conder and Kitchener, R. E. Transliterated and Explained by E.H. Palmer. Committee of the Palestine Exploration Fund.
- Thawaba, Salem (2009). "Urban growth of a city under siege: Tulkarm, Palestine over the past century". Journal of Planning History. 28: 27–46. doi:10.1177/1538513208327682. S2CID 145142269.
