= Hasan Karmi =

Palestinian linguist and broadcaster

- حسن سعيد الكرمي
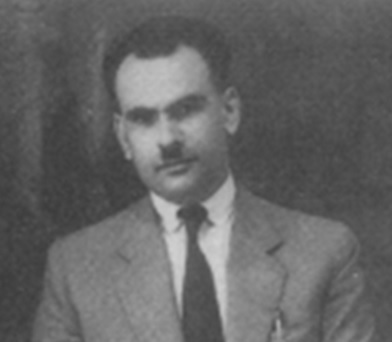
- Hasan Karmi
- Born: 1905; Tulkarm, Ottoman Empire
- Died: May 5, 2007 (aged 101–102); Amman, Jordan
- Children: Ghada Karmi, Siham al-Karmi, Ziyad Hassan Karmi.
- Relatives: Mahmoud Al-Karmi (brother); Ahmad Shakir al-Karmi ar:أحمد شاكر الكرمي (brother); Abdul-Ghani Al-Karmi (brother); Abu Salma (brother)

Hasan Sa'id Karmi (Arabic: حسن سعيد الكرمي; 1905 – May 5, 2007) was a Palestinian linguist and broadcaster for the BBC Arabic Service.

== Biography ==
Hasan Karmi was born in Tulkarm (then in the Ottoman Empire). The son of a sharia court judge, Sheikh Sa'id al-Karmi, and the brother of the poet Abd al-Karim al-Karmi. Karmi studied in a local Qur'anic school in Tulkarm and later attended English College in Jerusalem. He joined the British mandate government's education department and won two scholarships, in 1939 and 1945, to study at the Institute of Education in London.

== Practical life ==
Karmi joined the BBC Arabic Service and worked as a broadcaster for nearly 40 years. He was the creator, writer, and presenter of a weekly literary program called Qawlun ala Qawl (Saying on a Saying) devoted to Arabic poetry and proverbs. For years he also wrote a column in Huna London (London Calling), which the embassy in Saudi Arabia used to distribute on behalf of the BBC Arabic Service. In 1969 Karmi was awarded an MBE for services to the BBC.

Karmi was married to a Syrian woman, Amina, had one son, Ziyad, and two daughters, Siham and Ghada Karmi. He returned to the Middle East, to Jordan, in 1989 and spent his remaining years working on eleven dictionaries, one Arabic-English, the rest English-Arabic.

== Death ==
He died on 5 May 2007 in Amman, Jordan.

== Articles ==
- Craig, Sir James (14 May 2007). "Letter: Hasan Karmi". The Guardian.
- Karmi, Ghada: In Search of Fatima: A Palestinian Story ISBN 1-85984-694-7 Verso 2002
- Marwan Asmar; Remembering Hassan Al Karmi, the Intellectual I knew, Hackwriters.com
