= Burqin Church =

Greek Orthodox church in Burqin, West Bank, Palestine

Burqin Church (Church of the Ten Lepers)
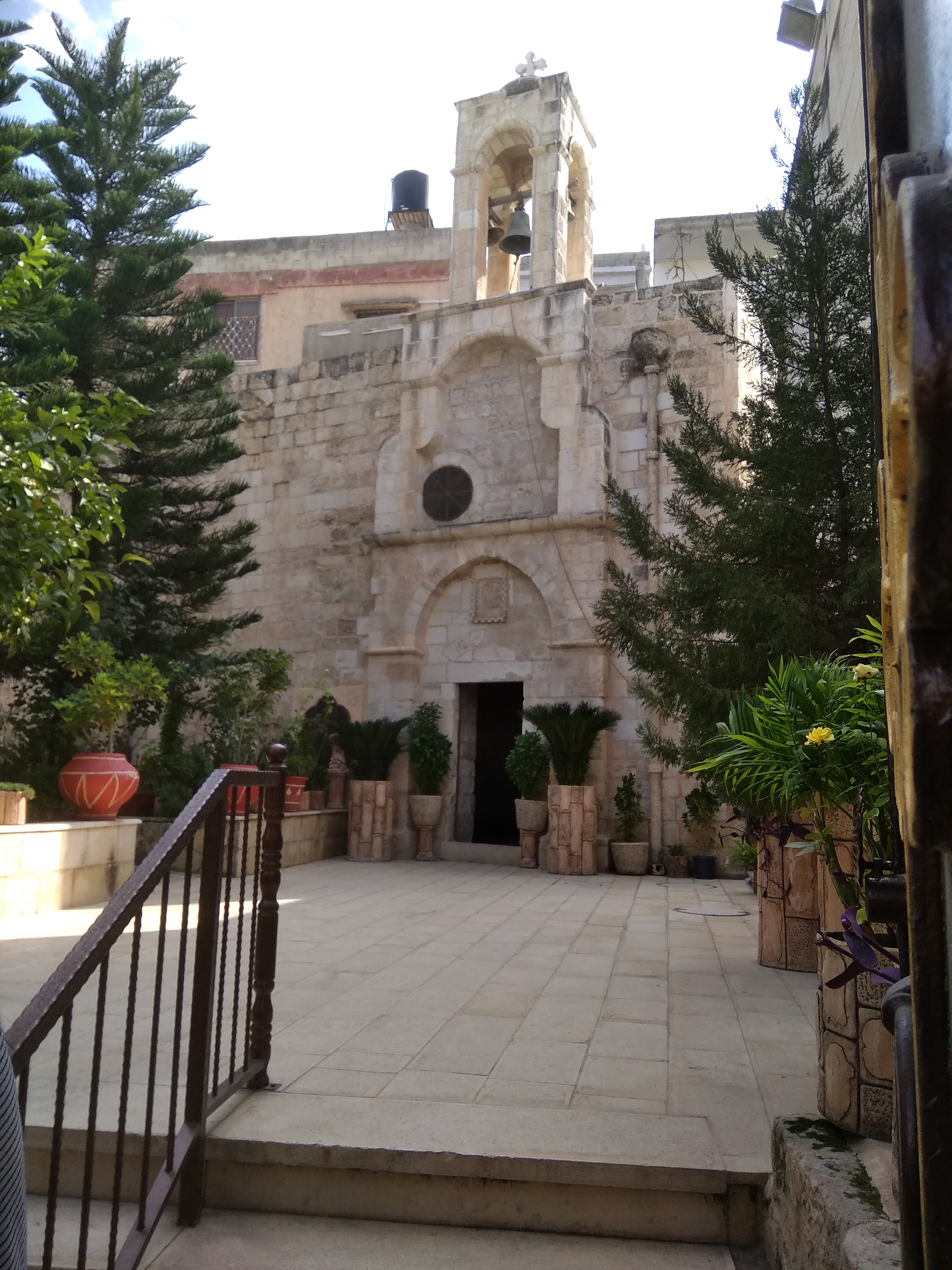

Religion
- Affiliation: Greek Orthodox Church of Jerusalem
- Province: Jenin Governorate

Location
- Location: Burqin, West Bank
- Country: Palestine
- Interactive map of Burqin Church (Church of the Ten Lepers)
- Coordinates: 32.457222°N 35.26°E

Architecture
- Completed: 12th century

The Burqin Church (Arabic: كنيسة برقين), also known as the Church of the Ten Lepers or Church of St George (Arabic: كنيسة القديس جاورجيوس), is a Greek Orthodox church established during the Byzantine period and located in Burqin, Jenin Governorate, West Bank, Palestine. It is considered to be the fifth holiest Christian holy place and the third-oldest church in the world. The church has been restored several times and is currently in use by the village's small Christian (Greek Orthodox) community.

== Biblical connection ==
According to Christian tradition, Burqin is the place in "the region between Samaria and Galilee" where the miracle from Luke 17:11–19 took place: Jesus was passing through on his way from Galilee to Jerusalem when he heard cries for help from ten lepers who were living isolated nearby. He encountered them and told them to present themselves to the priests, although they were not yet cured. On their way their leprosy disappeared. One of them, a Samaritan, returned to Jesus to give thanks. Jesus blamed the nine who did not recognise that their healing was God's gift, faith being the real salvation. Since this miracle, the church became a station for many Christian pilgrims.

== History and archaeology ==
Excavations show that the church passed through four different historical periods.

The administration of the site have said they discovered old remains when they renovated the church, such as oil lamps, Bibles and stamps, in addition to three large Roman-period wells.

=== Roman period ===
The cave where the miracle allegedly took place appears to be a Roman cistern and has an opening at the top. Today it contains an altar and has a stone wall at the entrance.

=== Byzantine and Early Muslim periods ===
The first church was built over the cave during the Byzantine period. Tradition has it that it was built by Saint Helena in the 4th century. During the 6th–9th centuries the church was extended with an additional building. Afterwards the church was abandoned for unapparent reasons.

=== Crusader period ===
The church was renovated during the Crusader period in the 12th century and enclosed by a stone wall. After the 13th century the church was rebuilt and rededicated as a school.

=== Ottoman to current times ===
Today, it is composed of the lepers' cave and an 18th-century hall and nave.

== See also ==
- Saint George: Devotions, traditions and prayers
- Church of Saint George, Tulkarm
