= Burqin, Palestine =

Municipality type C in Jenin, West Bank, Palestine

Burqin
- Municipality type C

Arabic transcription(s)
  - Arabic: برقين
  - Latin: Birqin (official)
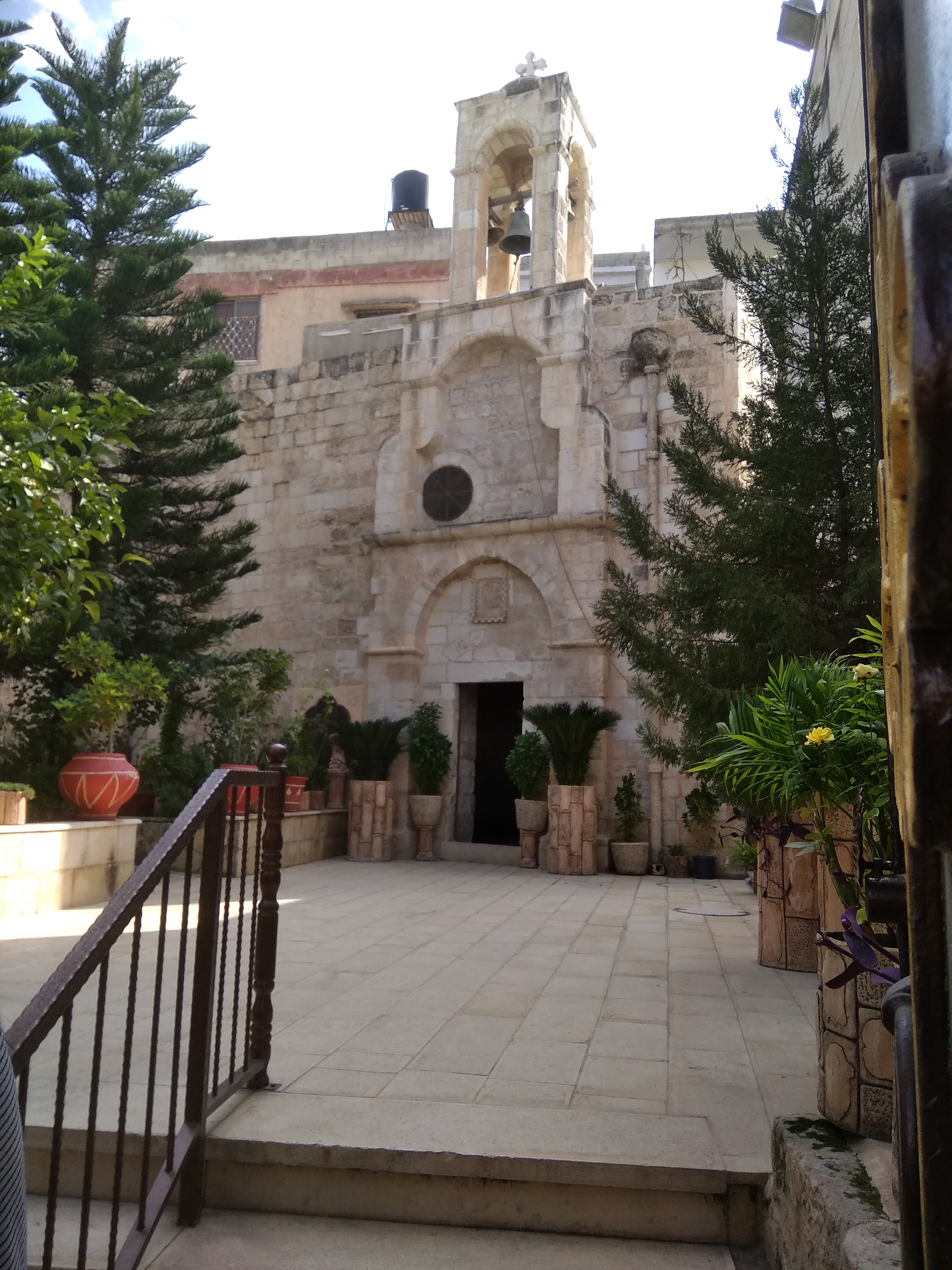
- St George Church in Burqin

- Location of Burqin within Palestine
- Coordinates: 32°27′20″N 35°15′37″E
- Palestine grid: 174/206
- State: State of Palestine
- Governorate: Jenin

Government
  - Type: Municipality
  - Head of Municipality: Mohammad Sabbah

Area
  - Total: 19.4 km^{2} (7.5 sq mi)

Population (2017)
  - Total: 7,126
  - Density: 367/km^{2} (951/sq mi)
- Name meaning: "Sandy soil covered with flint"

Burqin (Arabic: برقين) is a Palestinian town in the northern West Bank located 5 km west of Jenin. According to the Palestinian Central Bureau of Statistics (PCBS) census, its population was 5,685 in 2007 and 7,126 in 2017. The majority of Burqin's residents are Muslims, and 20 Christian families live in the town. The Byzantine-era Burqin Church or St. George's Church is one of the oldest churches in the world.

== History ==
Burqin is an ancient site, situated on a slope, with old stones reused in the town houses.

It was mentioned under the name Burqana, in the 14th century BCE Amarna letters, as one of several cities conquered by the Canaanite warlord Lab'ayu in the Dothan Valley and southern Jezreel Valley.

Pottery sherds from the Early Bronze I, Early Bronze IIB, Late Bronze III, Iron Age I, Iron Age II, late Roman, Byzantine, Umayyad/Abbasid, Medieval and early Ottoman era have been found.

=== Ottoman era ===
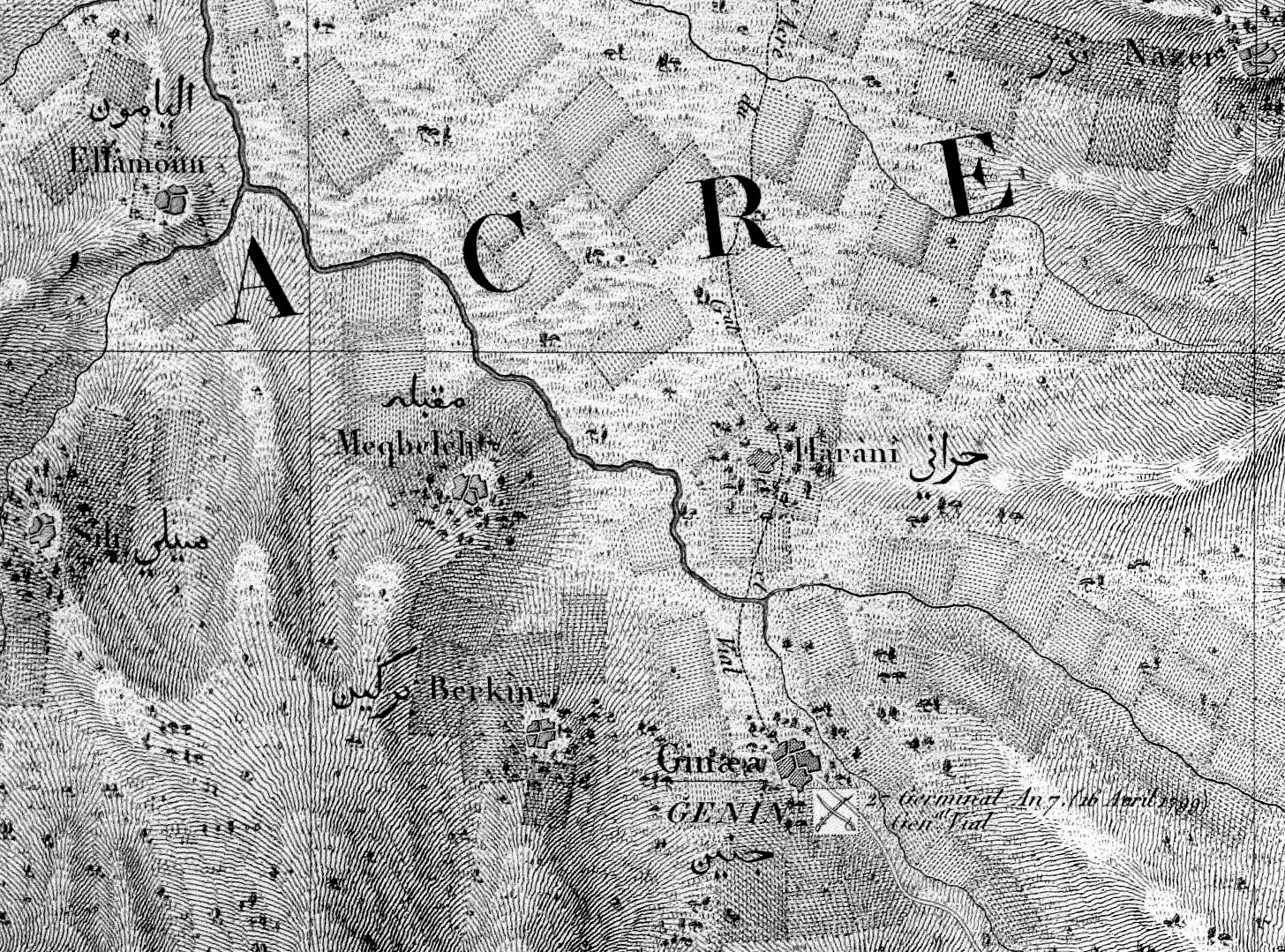
Burqin and vicinity in 1799

In 1517, the village was included in the Ottoman Empire with the rest of Palestine, and in the 1596 tax-records it appeared as Bruqin, located in the Nahiya of Jabal Sami of the Liwa of Nablus. The population was 23 households and 4 bachelors, all Muslim. They paid a tax rate of 33.3% on agricultural products, which included wheat, barley, summer crops, olive trees, occasional revenues, goats and beehives; a total of 7980 akçe.

In 1799, Pierre Jacotin placed the village, named Berkin, nearly straight west of Jenin on his map. In 1838 Edward Robinson placed Burqin as being in the District of Jenin, also called "Haritheh esh-Shemaliyeh".

In 1863, when Victor Guérin visited, he found the village to have about 1,000 inhabitants, all Muslim with the exception of 90 Greek Orthodox Christians. He further noted that "Some 30 excavated cisterns are evidence that this village sits upon an ancient settlement."

In 1870/1871 (1288 AH), an Ottoman census listed the village in the nahiya (sub-district) of al-Sha'rawiyya al-Sharqiyya.

In 1872, Claude Reignier Conder visited Burqin during his surveying work in Palestine. He was met by the local curé and shown the church. It had a stone screen on the east, shutting off three apses.

In 1882, the PEF's Survey of Western Palestine described Burkin as "A village of Greek Christians, with a small modern church for the Greek rite. It stands on the side of a white hill, with a good well below on the north, and olives near it."

=== British Mandate era ===
In the 1922 census of Palestine, conducted by the British Mandate authorities, Burqin had a population of 883; 871 Muslims and 12 Christians males, where all the Christians were Orthodox. This had increased in the 1931 census to a population of 1,086; 1,010 Muslim and 76 Christians, in a total of 227 inhabited houses.

In the 1945 statistics the population were 1,540; 1,430 Muslims and 110 Christians, with a total of 19,447 dunams of land, according to an official land and population survey. Of this, 3,902 dunams were used for plantations and irrigable land, 11,219 dunams for cereals, while 36 dunams were built-up (urban) land.

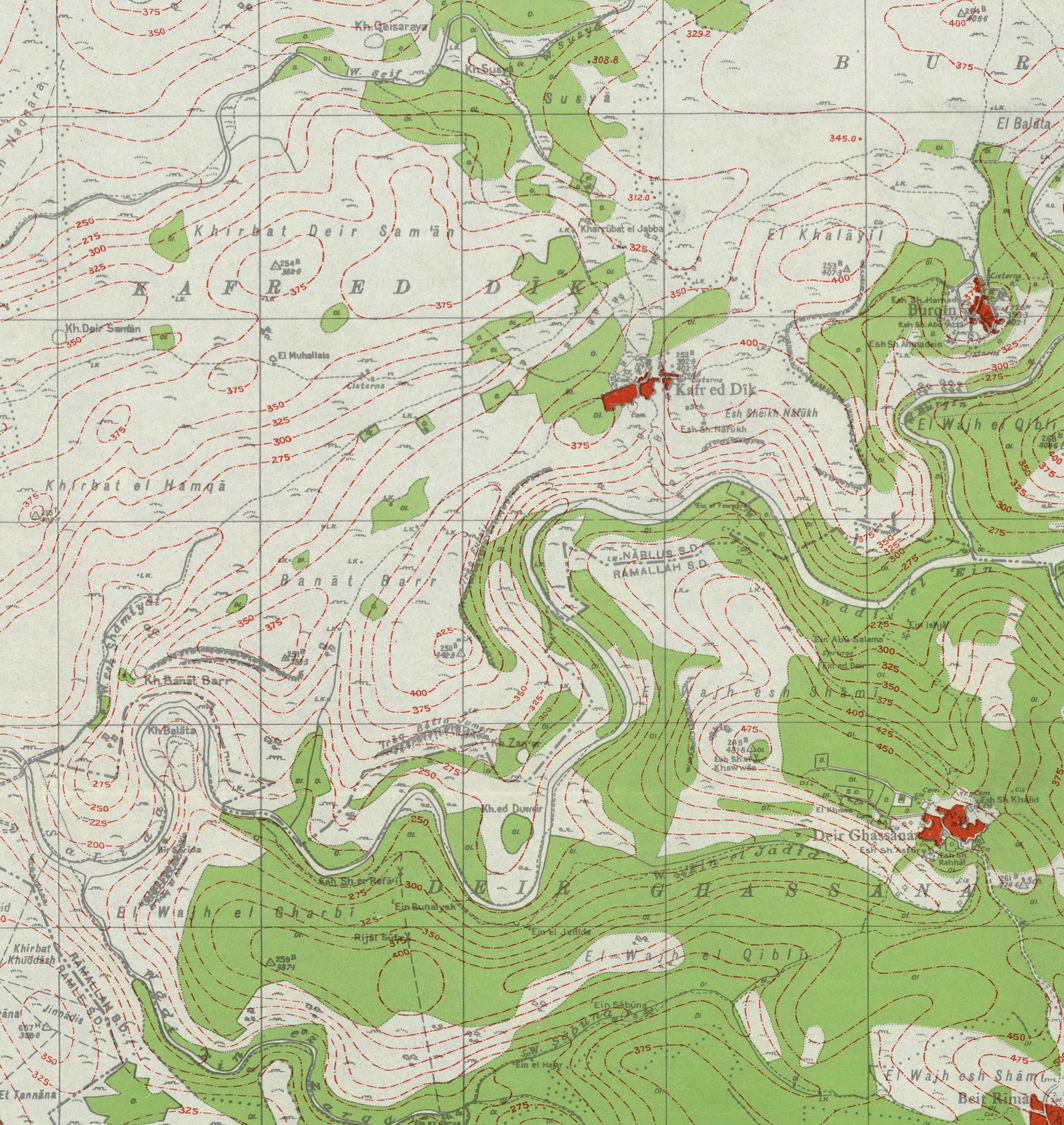
Burqin 1943 1:20,000

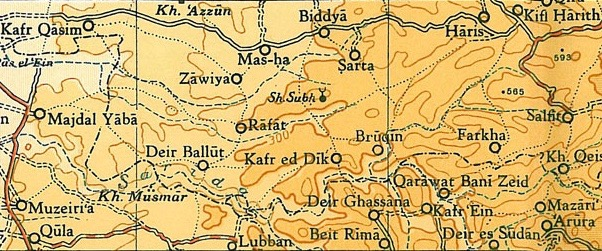
Burqin 1945 1:250,000

=== Jordanian era ===
In the wake of the 1948 Arab–Israeli War, and after the 1949 Armistice Agreements, Burqin came under Jordanian rule.

In 1961, the population of Birqin was 2,055.

=== Post 1967 ===
Since the Six-Day War in 1967, Burqin has been under Israeli occupation. According to the 1967 Census, the settlement had a population of 2,036, of whom 415 originated from Israeli territory.

On 21 July 2015 the 21-year-old Mohammed Ahmed Alauna of Burqin was shot dead during a confrontation with Israel forces who had entered the town on a night-time arrest mission.

== Demography ==
Among the residents, some originated from Syria, while others are Christians who migrated from various locations, including Lod, Beit Jala, Tubas, and Transjordan.

== People from Burqin ==
- Hana Shalabi
- Hadem Rida Jarrar

== Tourism ==
Burqin municipality and the Palestinian tourism ministry are working on making the Byzantine-era Burqin Church (St. George's Church) a popular tourist destination. Facilities in the town will be improved to be able to receive more tourists. The United States Agency for International Development (USAID) are funding a project to renovate an old building into a centre for tourists, where they can be offered general lectures and movie screenings before visiting the church and other historical places in the town.

The municipality are talking to UNESCO about listing the town as a World Heritage Site.

== Bibliography ==
- Barron, J.B., ed. (1923). Palestine: Report and General Abstracts of the Census of 1922. Government of Palestine.
- Conder, C.R. (1878). Tent work in Palestine. A record of discovery and adventure. Vol. 1. London: R. Bentley & Son.
- Conder, C.R.; Kitchener, H.H. (1882). The Survey of Western Palestine: Memoirs of the Topography, Orography, Hydrography, and Archaeology. Vol. 2. London: Committee of the Palestine Exploration Fund.
- Dauphin, C. (1998). La Palestine byzantine, Peuplement et Populations. BAR International Series 726 (in French). Vol. III : Catalogue. Oxford: Archeopress. ISBN 0-86054-905-4.
- Goren; et al., eds. (2004). Inscribed in clay: provenance study of the Amarna tablets and other ancient Near Eastern texts. Emery and Claire Yass Publications in Archaeology. ISBN 9789652660206.
- Government of Jordan, Department of Statistics (1964). First Census of Population and Housing. Volume I: Final Tables; General Characteristics of the Population (PDF).
- Government of Palestine, Department of Statistics (1945). Village Statistics, April, 1945.
- Guérin, V. (1875). Description Géographique Historique et Archéologique de la Palestine (in French). Vol. 2: Samarie, pt. 2. Paris: L'Imprimerie Nationale.
- Hadawi, S. (1970). Village Statistics of 1945: A Classification of Land and Area ownership in Palestine. Palestine Liberation Organization Research Center.
- Hütteroth, W.-D.; Abdulfattah, K. (1977). Historical Geography of Palestine, Transjordan and Southern Syria in the Late 16th Century. Erlanger Geographische Arbeiten, Sonderband 5. Erlangen, Germany: Vorstand der Fränkischen Geographischen Gesellschaft. ISBN 3-920405-41-2.
- Mills, E., ed. (1932). Census of Palestine 1931. Population of Villages, Towns and Administrative Areas. Jerusalem: Government of Palestine.
- Palmer, E.H. (1881). The Survey of Western Palestine: Arabic and English Name Lists Collected During the Survey by Lieutenants Conder and Kitchener, R. E. Transliterated and Explained by E.H. Palmer. Committee of the Palestine Exploration Fund.
- Robinson, E.; Smith, E. (1841). Biblical Researches in Palestine, Mount Sinai and Arabia Petraea: A Journal of Travels in the year 1838. Vol. 3. Boston: Crocker & Brewster.
- Zertal, A. (2004). The Manasseh Hill Country Survey. Vol. 1. Boston: BRILL. ISBN 9004137564.
