= Scenic West Athletic Conference =

Sports association

- Conference: NJCAA
- Founded: 1986; 40 years ago
- Sports fielded: 10; men's: 5; women's: 5
- Division: Division I
- No. of teams: 8
- Region: (Region 18)
- Website: scenicwestsports.com

The Scenic West Athletic Conference (also known as the Scenic West Conference) is a sports association for junior colleges located in Idaho, Utah, Colorado, Nevada, and California. The conference is a member of the NJCAA and sponsors 10 sports, 5 for men and 5 for women. It is the sole conference in the NJCAA's Region 18.

== History ==
The origins of the Scenic West started in 1986, as the nine schools in the region resumed round-robin competition after discontinuing it in 1985. Salt Lake Community College began play in 1987, and the conference adopted its current name in 1990.

Region 18 itself was formed in 1968, as Idaho, Montana, Oregon, and Washington were split off from Arizona, California, Nevada, and Utah, which remained in the NJCAA's Region 1. After almost all of the Oregon and Washington schools left the NJCAA to form the Northwest Athletic Association of Community Colleges (now NWAC) in 1983, Nevada, Utah, and far western Colorado were added the next year to Region 18 to keep the region feasible. This year brought the initial round-robin schedule, but the next year the addition of Flathead Community College of Montana caused that schedule to be dropped. This was short-lived, as Flathead's team disbanded during the season, and the remaining regional schools joined to form the current Scenic West.

== Member schools ==
=== Current members ===
The SWAC currently has nine full members, all but one are public schools:

| Institution | Location | Founded | Affiliation | Enrollment | Nickname | Joined | Previous conference |
|---|---|---|---|---|---|---|---|
| Colorado Northwestern Community College | Rangely, Colorado | 1962 | Public | 1,291 | Spartans | 1984 | Colorado (CCCAC) (NJCAA Region IX) |
| Community Christian College | Redlands, California | 1994 | Christian | 457 | Saints | 2021 | NJCAA Region I |
| North Idaho College (Note: North Idaho was previously in the Scenic West until 2016.) | Coeur d'Alene, Idaho | 1933 | Public | 7,800 | Cardinals | 1968; 2023 (Note: North Idaho's men's and women's basketball teams rejoined the conference one year before becoming a full member for other sports.) | Northwest (NWAC) Eastern |
| Salt Lake Community College | Taylorsville, Utah | 1948 | Public (Note: Part of the Utah System of Higher Education.) | 30,112 | Bruins | 1987 | N/A (Note: Declared as a new program, as it began sponsoring intercollegiate athletics.) |
| Snow College | Ephraim, Utah | 1888 | Public | 5,577 | Badgers | 1984 | NJCAA Region I |
| College of Southern Idaho | Twin Falls, Idaho | 1965 | Public | 9,100 | Golden Eagles | 1968 | NJCAA Region I |
| Truckee Meadows Community College | Reno, Nevada | 1971 | Public (Note: Part of the Nevada System of Higher Education.) | 11,849 | Mighty Lizards | 2019 | N/A |
| Utah State University Eastern (Note: Formerly known as College of Eastern Utah until 2010.) | Price, Utah | 1937 | Public | 2,173 | Eagles | 1984 | NJCAA Region I |

=== Former members ===
==== Scenic West ====
The SWAC had six former full members, all but one are public schools:

| Institution | Location | Founded | Affiliation | Enrollment | Nickname | Joined | Previous conference | Left | Current conference |
|---|---|---|---|---|---|---|---|---|---|
| Dixie State University (Note: Formerly known as Dixie College until 2001, later as Dixie State College from 2001 to 2011, then as Dixie State University from 2011 to 2022, now currently known as Utah Tech University since 2022.) | St. George, Utah | 1911 | Public (Note: Part of the Utah System of Higher Education.) | 10,000 | Rebels (Note: Dixie State's/Utah Tech's nickname changed to Red Storm from 2009 to 2016, and then to Trailblazers since 2016.) | 1984 | NJCAA Region I | 2006 | Big Sky (Note: Currently an NCAA Division I athletic conference.) |
| Brigham Young University–Idaho (Note: Formerly known as Ricks College until 2001.) | Rexburg, Idaho | 1888 | LDS Church | 16,773 | Vikings | 1968 | NJCAA Region I | 2002 | N/A (Note: Discontinued its intercollegiate athletics program.) |
| College of Southern Nevada | Henderson, Nevada | 1971 | Public (Note: Part of the Nevada System of Higher Education.) | 28,820 | Coyotes | 2002 | Independent | 2023 | Arizona CC (ACCAC) |
| Treasure Valley Community College | Ontario, Oregon | 1962 | Public (Note: Part of the Oregon Community College Association.) | 2,559 | Chukars | 1968 | NJCAA Region I | 2002 | Northwest (NWAC) Eastern |
| Utah Valley University (Note: Formerly known as Utah Valley College from 1987–1993 and Utah Valley State College for the rest of the school's SWAC tenure. Currently known as Utah Valley University since 2007.) | Orem, Utah | 1941 | Public | 31,556 | Wolverines | 1984 | NJCAA Region I | 2003 | Big West (BWC) |
| Western Nevada College | Carson City, Nevada | 1971 | Public | 4,168 | Wildcats | 2006 | N/A (Note: Declared as a new program, as it began sponsoring intercollegiate athletics.) | 2016 | N/A |

==== Schools leaving before Region XVIII became the NWAC ====
| Institution | Location | Founded | Affiliation | Enrollment | Nickname | Joined | Previous conference | Left | Current conference |
|---|---|---|---|---|---|---|---|---|---|
| Bellevue College | Bellevue, Washington | 1966 | Public (Note: Part of the Washington Community and Technical Colleges System.) | 37,000 | Bulldogs | 1968 | NJCAA Region I | 1983 | NWAACC Northern |
| Big Bend Community College | Moses Lake, Washington | 1962 | Public | 5,400 | Vikings | 1968 | NJCAA Region I | 1983 | NWAACC Eastern |
| Blue Mountain Community College | Pendleton, Oregon | 1962 | Public (Note: Part of the Oregon Community College Association.) | 10,600 | Timberwolves | 1968 | NJCAA Region I | 1983 | NWAACC Eastern |
| Central Oregon Community College | Bend, Oregon | 1949 | Public | 18,339 | Broncos | 1968 | NJCAA Region I | 1982 | N/A (Note: Discontinued its intercollegiate athletics program.) |
| Centralia College | Centralia, Washington | 1925 | Public | 4,803 | Trailblazers | 1968 | NJCAA Region I | 1983 | NWAACC Western |
| Chemeketa Community College | Salem, Oregon | 1969 | Public | 50,000 | Storm | 1969 | N/A (Note: Declared as a new program, as it began sponsoring intercollegiate athletics.) | 1983 | NWAACC Southern |
| Clackamas Community College | Oregon City, Oregon | 1966 | Public | 25,029 | Cougars | 1968 | N/A | 1984 | NWAACC Southern |
| Clark College | Vancouver, Washington | 1933 | Public | 14,000 | Penguins | 1968 | NJCAA Region I | 1983 | NWAACC Western |
| Clatsop Community College | Astoria, Oregon | 1958 | Public | 1,550 | Patriots | 1968 | N/A | 1976 | N/A |
| Columbia Basin College | Pasco, Washington | 1955 | Public | 13,000 | Hawks | 1968 | NJCAA Region I | 1983 | NWAACC Eastern |
| Columbia Christian College (Note: Later known as Cascade College from 1993 until 2009.) | Eugene, Oregon | 1956 | Churches of Christ | N/A | Thunderbirds | 1968 | | 1971 | school closed in 2009 |
| Concordia Junior College (Note: Later known as Concordia College from 1977 until 1995; then known as Concordia University from 1995 until 2020.) | Portland, Oregon | 1905 | Lutheran LCMS | 3,111 | Cavaliers | 1968 | | 1970 | school closed in 2020 |
| Edmonds College | Edmonds, Washington | 1967 | Public | 12,000 | Tritons | 1968 | NJCAA Region I | 1983 | NWAACC Northern |
| Everett Community College | Everett, Washington | 1941 | Public | 19,666 | Trojans | 1968 | NJCAA Region I | 1983 | NWAACC Northern |
| Flathead Valley Community College | Kalispell, Montana | 1967 | Public | 2,495 | Braves | 1985 | N/A | 1986 | N/A |
| Fort Steilacoom Community College (Note: Currently known as Pierce College since 1986.) | Lakewood, Washington | 1967 | Public | 21,643 | Raiders | 1968 | N/A | 1983 | NWAACC Western |
| Grays Harbor College | Aberdeen, Washington | 1930 | Public | 2,088 | Chokers | 1968 | NJCAA Region I | 1983 | NWAACC Western |
| Green River Community College (Note: Currently known as Green River College since 2014.) | Auburn, Washington | 1963 | Public | 9,212 | Gators | 1968 | NJCAA Region I | 1983 | NWAACC Western |
| Highline College | Des Moines, Washington | 1961 | Public | 18,993 | Thunderbirds | 1968 | NJCAA Region I | 1983 | NWAACC Western |
| Judson Baptist College | The Dalles, Oregon | 1956 | Baptist | N/A | Bobcats | 1968 | | 1980 | school closed in 1985 |
| Lane Community College | Eugene, Oregon | 1964 | Public | 18,678 | Titans | 1968 | N/A | 1983 | NWAACC Southern |
| Linn-Benton Community College | Albany, Oregon | 1966 | Public | 12,360 | Roadrunners | 1970 | N/A | 1983 | NWAACC Southern |
| Lower Columbia College | Longview, Washington | 1934 | Public | 8,465 | Red Devils | 1968 | NJCAA Region I | 1983 | NWAACC Western |
| Mt. Hood Community College | Gresham, Oregon | 1966 | Public | 8,370 | Saints | 1968 | N/A | 1983 | NWAACC Southern |
| Olympic College | Bremerton, Washington | 1946 | Public | 12,285 | Rangers | 1968 | NJCAA Region I | 1983 | NWAACC Northern |
| Peninsula College | Port Angeles, Washington | 1961 | Public | 10,000 | Pirates | 1968 | NJCAA Region I | 1983 | NWAACC Northwen |
| Seattle Central College | Seattle, Washington | 1946 | Public | 18,800 | Cougars | 1969 | N/A | 1981 | N/A |
| Shoreline Community College | Shoreline, Washington | 1964 | Public | 13,795 | Dolphins | 1968 | N/A | 1983 | NWAACC Northern |
| Skagit Valley College | Mount Vernon, Washington | 1926 | Public | 5,136 | Cardinals | 1968 | NJCAA Region I | 1983 | NWAACC Northern |
| Southwestern Oregon Community College | Coos Bay, Oregon | 1941 | Public | 14,500 | Lakers | 1968 | NJCAA Region I | 1983 | NWAACC Southern |
| Spokane Community College | Spokane, Washington | 1963 | Public | 38,600 | Sasquatch | 1968 | NJCAA Region I | 1983 | NWAACC Eastern |
| Spokane Falls Community College | Spokane, Washington | 1967 | Public | 8,356 | Bigfoot | 1970 | N/A | 1976 | N/A |
| Tacoma Community College | Tacoma, Washington | 1965 | Public | 15,000 | Titans | 1968 | NJCAA Region I | 1983 | NWAACC Western |
| Umpqua Community College | Winchester, Oregon | 1964 | Public | 13,300 | Riverhawks | 1968 | N/A | 1983 | NWAACC Southern |
| Walla Walla Community College | Walla Walla, Washington | 1967 | Public | 13,000 | Warriors | 1968 | N/A | 1983 | NWAACC Eastern |
| Wenatchee Valley College | Wenatchee, Washington | 1939 | Public | 3,353 | Knights | 1968 | NJCAA Region I | 1983 | NWAACC Eastern |
| Yakima Valley Community College (Note: Currently known as Yakima Valley College since 2022.) | Yakima, Washington | 1941 | Public | 10,000 | Yaks | 1968 | NJCAA Region I | 1983 | NWAACC Eastern |

=== Region 18 Divisions ===
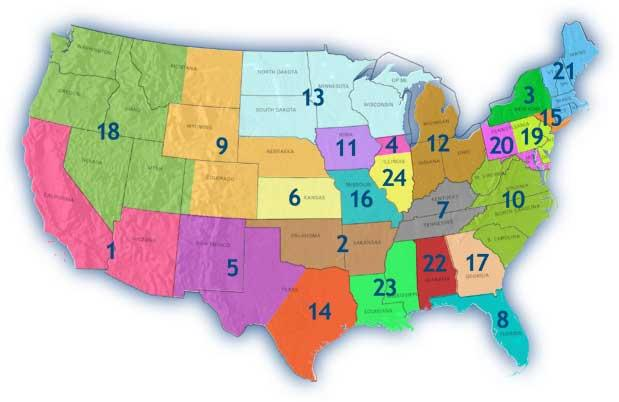
Current NJCAA map of Regions

1968-69

| Eastern | Oregon | | Washington | |
| | Eastern | Western | Eastern | Western |
|---|---|---|---|---|
| Northern Idaho | Blue Mountain | Clackamas | Bellevue | Centralia |
| Ricks | Central Oregon | Clatsop | Big Bend | Clark |
| Southern Idaho | Columbia Christian | Concordia | Columbia Basin | Edmonds |
| Treasure Valley | Judson Baptist | Lane | Everett | Fort Steilacoom |
| | Mt. Hood | Southwest Oregon | Shoreline | Grays Harbor |
| | | Umpqua | Skagit Valley | Green River |
| | | | Spokane | Highline |
| | | | Walla Walla | Lower Columbia |
| | | | Wenatchee Valley | Olympic |
| | | | Yakima Valley | Peninsula |
| | | | | Tacoma |

1969-70

| Eastern | Oregon | | Washington | |
| | Eastern | Western | Coastal | Cross-State |
|---|---|---|---|---|
| Northern Idaho | Blue Mountain | Clackamas | Bellevue | Big Bend |
| Ricks | Central Oregon | Clatsop | Centralia | Columbia Basin |
| Southern Idaho | Chemeketa | Concordia | Clark | Fort Steilacoom |
| Treasure Valley | Columbia Christian | Lane | Edmonds | Green River |
| | Judson Baptist | Southwest Oregon | Everett | Highline |
| | Mt. Hood | Umpqua | Grays Harbor | Olympic |
| | | | Lower Columbia | Spokane |
| | | | Peninsula | Tacoma |
| | | | Seattle Central | Walla Walla |
| | | | Shoreline | Wenatchee Valley |
| | | | Skagit Valley | Yakima Valley |

1970-71

| Eastern | Oregon | | Washington | |
| | Northern | Southern | Coastal | Cross-State |
|---|---|---|---|---|
| Northern Idaho | Blue Mountain | Central Oregon | Bellevue | Big Bend |
| Ricks | Clackamas | Chemeketa | Centralia | Columbia Basin |
| Southern Idaho | Clatsop | Lane | Clark | Fort Steilacoom |
| Treasure Valley | Columbia Christian | Linn-Benton | Edmonds | Green River |
| | Judson Baptist | Southwest Oregon | Everett | Highline |
| | Mt. Hood | Umpqua | Grays Harbor | Olympic |
| | | | Lower Columbia | Spokane |
| | | | Peninsula | Spokane Falls |
| | | | Seattle Central | Tacoma |
| | | | Shoreline | Walla Walla |
| | | | Skagit Valley | Wenatchee Valley |
| | | | | Yakima Valley |

1971-72 to 1973-74

| Eastern | Northwestern | | | Oregon |
| | Coastal | Eastern | Puget Sound | |
|---|---|---|---|---|
| Northern Idaho | Centralia | Big Bend | Bellevue | Blue Mountain |
| Ricks | Clark | Columbia Basin | Edmonds | Central Oregon |
| Southern Idaho | Grays Harbor | Mt. Hood | Everett | Chemeketa |
| Treasure Valley | Lower Columbia | Spokane | Fort Steilacoom | Clackamas |
| | Highline | Spokane Falls | Green River | Clatsop |
| | Olympic | Walla Walla | Seattle Central | Judson Baptist |
| | Peninsula | Wenatchee Valley | Shoreline | Lane |
| | | Yakima Valley | Skagit Valley | Linn-Benton |
| | | | Tacoma | Southwest Oregon |
| | | | | Umpqua |

1974-75 to 1975-76

| Eastern | Northwestern | | | Oregon |
| | Coastal | Eastern | Puget Sound | |
|---|---|---|---|---|
| Northern Idaho | Centralia | Big Bend | Bellevue | Blue Mountain |
| Ricks | Clark | Columbia Basin | Edmonds | Central Oregon |
| Southern Idaho | Grays Harbor | Spokane | Everett | Chemeketa |
| Treasure Valley | Highline | Spokane Falls | Fort Steilacoom | Clackamas |
| | Lower Columbia | Walla Walla | Green River | Clatsop |
| | Mt. Hood | Wenatchee Valley | Seattle Central | Judson Baptist |
| | Olympic | Yakima Valley | Shoreline | Lane |
| | Peninsula | | Skagit Valley | Linn-Benton |
| | | | Tacoma | Southwest Oregon |
| | | | | Umpqua |

1976-77 to 1977-78

| Eastern | Northwestern | | | Oregon |
| | Coastal | Eastern | Puget Sound | |
|---|---|---|---|---|
| Northern Idaho | Centralia | Big Bend | Bellevue | Blue Mountain |
| Ricks | Clark | Columbia Basin | Edmonds | Central Oregon |
| Southern Idaho | Grays Harbor | Spokane | Everett | Chemeketa |
| Treasure Valley | Highline | Spokane Falls | Fort Steilacoom | Clackamas |
| | Lower Columbia | Walla Walla | Green River | Judson Baptist |
| | Mt. Hood | Wenatchee Valley | Seattle Central | Lane |
| | Olympic | Yakima Valley | Shoreline | Linn-Benton |
| | Peninsula | | Skagit Valley | Southwest Oregon |
| | | | Tacoma | Umpqua |

1978-79

| Eastern | Northwestern | | | Oregon |
| | Coastal | Eastern | Puget Sound | |
|---|---|---|---|---|
| Northern Idaho | Centralia | Big Bend | Bellevue | Blue Mountain |
| Ricks | Clark | Columbia Basin | Edmonds | Central Oregon |
| Southern Idaho | Grays Harbor | Spokane | Everett | Chemeketa |
| Treasure Valley | Highline | Walla Walla | Fort Steilacoom | Clackamas |
| | Lower Columbia | Wenatchee Valley | Green River | Judson Baptist |
| | Mt. Hood | Yakima Valley | Seattle Central | Lane |
| | Olympic | | Shoreline | Linn-Benton |
| | Peninsula | | Skagit Valley | Southwest Oregon |
| | | | Tacoma | Umpqua |

1979-80 to 1980-81

| Eastern | Northwestern | | | Oregon |
| | Coastal | Eastern | Puget Sound | |
|---|---|---|---|---|
| Northern Idaho | Centralia | Big Bend | Bellevue | Blue Mountain |
| Ricks | Clark | Columbia Basin | Edmonds | Central Oregon |
| Southern Idaho | Grays Harbor | Spokane | Everett | Chemeketa |
| Treasure Valley | Highline | Walla Walla | Fort Steilacoom | Clackamas |
| | Lower Columbia | Wenatchee Valley | Green River | Judson Baptist (-80) |
| | Olympic | Yakima Valley | Seattle Central | Lane |
| | Peninsula | | Shoreline | Linn-Benton |
| | | | Skagit Valley | Mt. Hood |
| | | | Tacoma | Southwest Oregon |
| | | | | Umpqua |

1981-82 to 1982-83

| Eastern | Northwestern | | | Oregon |
| | Coastal | Eastern | Puget Sound | |
|---|---|---|---|---|
| Northern Idaho | Centralia | Big Bend | Bellevue | Blue Mountain |
| Ricks | Clark | Columbia Basin | Edmonds | Central Oregon (-82) |
| Southern Idaho | Grays Harbor | Spokane | Everett | Chemeketa |
| Treasure Valley | Highline | Walla Walla | Fort Steilacoom | Clackamas |
| | Lower Columbia | Wenatchee Valley | Green River | Lane |
| | Olympic | Yakima Valley | Shoreline | Linn-Benton |
| | Peninsula | | Skagit Valley | Mt. Hood |
| | Tacoma | | | Southwest Oregon |
| | | | | Umpqua |

Post-NWAACC Alignments

| 1983-84 | 1984-85 | | 1985-86 | |
| | Northern | Southern | Northern | Southern |
|---|---|---|---|---|
| Clackamas | North Idaho | Colorado Northwestern | Flathead | Colorado Northwestern |
| North Idaho | Ricks | Dixie | North Idaho | Dixie |
| Ricks | Southern Idaho | Eastern Utah | Ricks | Eastern Utah |
| Southern Idaho | Treasure Valley | Snow | Southern Idaho | Snow |
| Treasure Valley | | Utah Valley State | Treasure Valley | Utah Valley State |

== Sponsored sports (men) ==
- Basketball
- Baseball – uses wooden bats in conference play
- Golf
- Wrestling
- Soccer

== Sponsored sports (women) ==
- Basketball
- Golf
- Soccer
- Softball
- Volleyball
