= Washington State Board for Community and Technical Colleges =

State agency and public college system

The Washington State Board for Community and Technical Colleges (SBCTC) is a Washington state agency that oversees and coordinates between the 34 members of Washington's public community and technical college system. Governed by a nine-member board appointed by the state governor, the system consists of the accredited colleges and their branch campuses, which all offer two-year associate's degrees, with select colleges offering four-year bachelor's degrees.

A system of community colleges in Washington was first established by the Community College Act of 1967, which created 22 community college districts to be governed by a statewide board. The current agency, along with administering the Community and Technical College Act, provides the member colleges with budgetary coordination and inter-college information technology services. The board also coordinates, along with the Workforce Training and Education Coordinating Board, the development of workforce training and other vocational education opportunities.

== List ==
There are 34 community and technical colleges within the SBCTC system, serving 30 college districts.

College	Location	District (Note: The three districts composed of more than one college are: Spokane Colleges (Spokane and Spokane Falls Community Colleges), Seattle Colleges (Central, North, and South Seattle Colleges), and the Pierce College District (Pierce College Fort Steilacoom and Puyallup).)
Bates Technical College	Tacoma	28
Bellevue College	Bellevue	8
Bellingham Technical College	Bellingham	25
Big Bend Community College	Moses Lake	18
Cascadia College	Bothell	30
Centralia College	Centralia	12
Clark College	Vancouver	14
Clover Park Technical College	Lakewood	29
Columbia Basin College	Pasco	19
Edmonds College	Lynnwood	23
Everett Community College	Everett	5
Grays Harbor College	Aberdeen	2
Green River College	Auburn	10
Highline College	Des Moines	9
Lake Washington Institute of Technology	Kirkland	26
Lower Columbia College	Longview	13
North Seattle College	Seattle	6
Olympic College	Bremerton	3
Peninsula College	Port Angeles	1
Pierce College Fort Steilacoom	Lakewood	11
Pierce College Puyallup	Puyallup	11
Renton Technical College	Renton	27
Seattle Central College	Seattle	6
Shoreline Community College	Shoreline	7
Skagit Valley College	Mt. Vernon	4
South Puget Sound Community College	Olympia	24
South Seattle College	Seattle	6
Spokane Community College	Spokane	17
Spokane Falls Community College	Spokane	17
Tacoma Community College	Tacoma	22
Walla Walla Community College	Walla Walla	20
Wenatchee Valley College	Wenatchee	15
Whatcom Community College	Bellingham	21
Yakima Valley College	Yakima	16

== Programs ==
=== Dual credit ===
SBCTC offers multiple dual credit programs for students in Washington to earn college credit while still enrolled in high school.

==== CTE Dual Credit ====
CTE Dual Credit, formerly known as Tech Prep, is a dual credit program in which students take career and technical education coursework at their high school and receive college credit from a community or technical college, on top of their high school credit, for the course. Colleges offering CTE Dual Credit partnerships are organized into consortia, although students may be able to register for CTE Dual Credit courses through colleges outside of their regional consortium. Similar to college in the high school programs, which some Washington state colleges also offer, credit is awarded by both the high school and a college for coursework taken at the high school.

==== Running Start ====
Running Start is a dual credit program offered by the 34 SBCTC colleges as well as three public universities and two tribal colleges in Washington. Students in Running Start take courses at a college to receive transferable college credit and fulfill high school graduation requirements simultaneously.

== See also ==
- List of colleges and universities in Washington
