= Paul Seale =

American gridiron football player (born 1939)

Profile
- Position: Linebacker

Personal information
- Born: March 29, 1939 (age 87)
- Listed height: 6 ft 3 in (1.91 m)
- Listed weight: 205 lb (93 kg)

Career history
- 1963–1965: BC Lions

Awards and highlights
- Grey Cup champion (1964)

Paul S. Seale (born March 29, 1939) is an American former gridiron football player and coach. He played Canadian football professionally for the BC Lions of the Canadian Football League (CFL) from 1963 to 1965. He won the Grey Cup with them in 1964. Seale played college football at Wenatchee Valley College and Oregon State University.

After retiring from playing, Seale was an assistant football coach at Corvallis High School in Corvallis, Oregon for two years under Lee Gustafson before succeeding him as head coach. He was hired as the head football coach at Wenatchee Valley in 1969. Seale resigned from his post at Wenatchee Valley following the 1974 season. He led his teams there to a record of 19–35–1 over six seasons. His 1971 team went 9–1 and won the Northwest Community College Conference title.

Seale is a member of the Wenatchee Valley College and BC Sports Halls of Fame.

== Head coaching record ==
=== Junior college ===
Year	Team	Overall	Conference	Standing	Bowl/playoffs
Wenatchee Valley Knights (Washington / Northwest Community College Conference) (1969–1974)
1969	Wenatchee Valley	0–9	0–6	4th (Eastern)	
1970	Wenatchee Valley	3–6	2–6	T–4th (Eastern)	
1971	Wenatchee Valley	9–1	7–1	1st (Eastern)	
1972	Wenatchee Valley	3–5–1	2–5–1	5th (Eastern)	
1973	Wenatchee Valley	3–6	2–6	T–3rd (Eastern)	
1974	Wenatchee Valley	1–8	1–7	5th (Eastern)	
Wenatchee Valley:		19–35–1	14–31–1		
Total:		19–35–1			
National championship Conference title Conference division title or championship game berth
