= Blue Mountain Community College =

College in Pendleton, Oregon, U.S.

Coordinates: 45.677°N 118.816°W

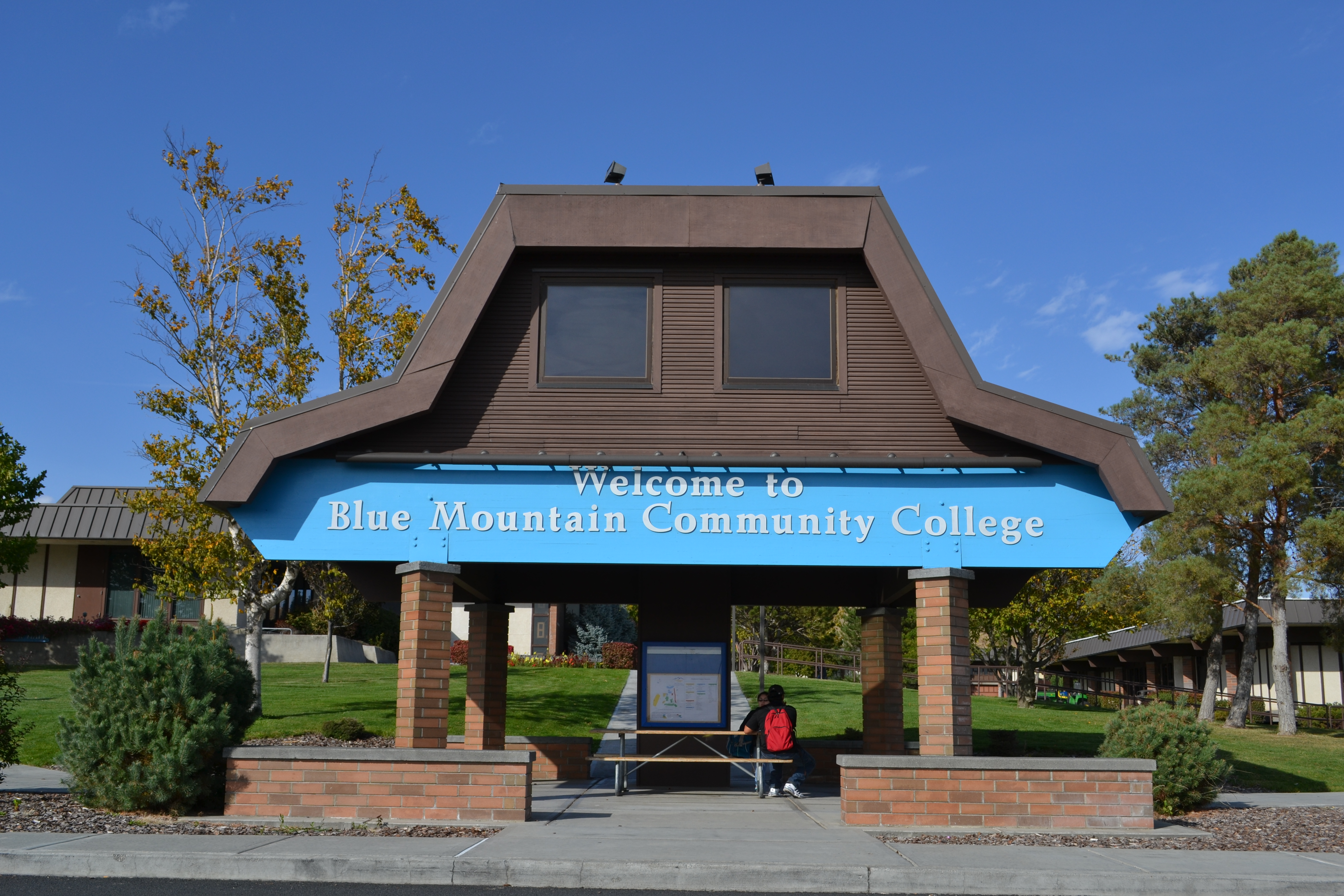
- Type: Public community college
- Established: 1962
- President: J. Mark Browning
- Location: Pendleton, Oregon, United States
- Mascot: Timberwolves
- Website: www.bluecc.edu

Blue Mountain Community College is a public community college in Pendleton, Oregon, United States. It serves Umatilla and Morrow counties as well as most of Baker County. It was established in 1962 and offers Associate of Arts degrees, Associate of Science degrees, Associate of Applied Science degrees, certificates, and transfer degrees to four-year colleges.

== Locations ==
The college's main branch is in Pendleton. Other branches are in Milton-Freewater, Hermiston, Baker City, John Day, Ione, and Boardman.

Blue Mountain also offers a variety of distance education programs for students residing in outlying areas.

Eastern Oregon University also has a Distance Education Office located at the Pendleton branch of BMCC.

== Athletics ==
The college has athletics for both men and women organized under the office of Student and Enrollment Services. BMCC is a member of the Northwest Athletic Association of Community Colleges and the National Intercollegiate Rodeo Association. BMCC offers basketball, volleyball, baseball, softball, golf and rodeo.

The Northwest Athletic Association of Community Colleges comprises 36 colleges divided into four regions. Blue Mountain CC is in the Eastern Region along with Big Bend CC, Columbia Basin College, CC of Spokane, Walla Walla CC, Wenatchee Valley College, Yakima Valley CC and Treasure Valley CC.

Blue Mountain's athletic complex was completed in 1975.

== See also ==
- List of Oregon community colleges
