= Ron East =

American football player (1943–2023)

No. 79, 77, 74
- Positions: Defensive tackle, Defensive end

Personal information
- Born: August 26, 1943; Portland, Oregon, U.S.
- Died: September 30, 2023 (aged 80); Kirkland, Washington, U.S.
- Listed height: 6 ft 4 in (1.93 m)
- Listed weight: 250 lb (113 kg)

Career information
- High school: Portland (OR) Lincoln
- College: Montana State; Oregon State
- NFL draft: 1967: undrafted

Career history
- Dallas Cowboys (1967–1970); San Diego Chargers (1971–1973); The Hawaiians (1974); Cleveland Browns (1975); Atlanta Falcons (1976); Seattle Seahawks (1977)

Awards and highlights
- All-Big Sky (1966)

Career NFL statistics
- Fumble recoveries: 8
- Safeties: 1
- Sacks: 28
- Stats at Pro Football Reference

Ronald Allan East (August 26, 1943 – September 30, 2023) was an American professional football defensive tackle in the National Football League for the Dallas Cowboys, San Diego Chargers, Cleveland Browns, Atlanta Falcons and Seattle Seahawks. He played college football at Oregon State University and Montana State University, following his completion of service to the United States Marine Corps.

== Early life ==
East attended Lincoln High School, where he practiced football, wrestling and track. He was the State's javelin champion as a senior.

East accepted a football scholarship from Oregon State University, but he was considered too small to eventually become a starter. He decided to leave school after his freshman season and enlist in the Marine Forces Reserve.

After boot camp, he opted to transfer to Columbia Basin College. He was a starter at defensive tackle, he received All-Conference honors twice, while helping his team go undefeated and win the NWAC Championship in 1965.

In 1966, he transferred to Montana State University for his senior season. He contributed to the team winning the Big Sky conference championship and received All-Conference honors. He also was the Big Sky javelin champion.

In 1994, he was inducted into the Northwest Athletic Conference Hall of Fame. In 1999, he was inducted into the Montana State University Hall of Fame.

== Professional career ==
=== Dallas Cowboys ===
East was signed as an undrafted free agent by the Dallas Cowboys after the 1967 NFL/AFL draft. He was the fifth defensive lineman and a backup for defensive tackles Bob Lilly and Jethro Pugh. Tom Landry would later say "Ron East was the most aggressive player he ever coached".

After trading the troubled Lance Rentzel, the Cowboys replaced him with future hall of famer Lance Alworth and East was sent to the San Diego Chargers as part of the "Bambi trade" on May 19, 1971, that also involved Pettis Norman and Tony Liscio.

=== San Diego Chargers ===
East was a three-year starter at left defensive tackle as part of a castoff defensive line that included Deacon Jones, Dave Costa, Lionel Aldridge and Coy Bacon. He and Jones sacked quarterback Bob Griese in game 5 of the 1972 Miami Dolphins Perfect season. Griese went down with a broken leg and dislocated ankle, forcing the Dolphins to replace him with Earl Morrall until the Super Bowl VII game.

=== The Hawaiians (WFL) ===
On March 25, 1974, he signed a contract with The Hawaiians of the World Football League. After his original contract was not honored, he decided to return to the NFL.

=== Cleveland Browns ===
On July 16, 1975, he was traded to the Cleveland Browns in exchange for a fifth round draft choice (#128-Cliff Olander). He was named the starter left defensive end. On August 19, 1976, he was traded to the Atlanta Falcons in exchange for a seventh round draft choice (#173-Ken Randle).

=== Atlanta Falcons ===
In 1976, he started only one game and was mostly a reserve player. In June 1977, he was released after new head coach Leeman Bennett was hired.

=== Seattle Seahawks ===
On July 18, 1977, he signed as a free agent with the Seattle Seahawks and was named the starter at left defensive tackle. He was waived on August 29, 1978.

== Personal life and death ==
After retiring he was a real estate developer in Seattle, Washington. His wife gave birth to Ron's son while he was playing in Super Bowl V on January 17, 1971.

Ron East died in Kirkland, Washington on September 30, 2023, at the age of 80.
