= Steve Cotter =

Canadian football player (1940–2022)

Profile
- Positions: Defensive end, Guard

Personal information
- Born: September 15, 1940; Vancouver, British Columbia
- Died: February 10, 2022 (aged 81); Kamloops, British Columbia
- Listed height: 6 ft 2 in (1.88 m)
- Listed weight: 220 lb (100 kg)

Career information
- University: Wenatchee Valley

Career history
- 1960–1965: BC Lions
- 1966–1967: Edmonton Eskimos
- 1969: Edmonton Eskimos

Awards and highlights
- Grey Cup champion (1964)

Stephen Dugald Cotter (September 15, 1940 – February 10, 2022) was a Canadian professional football player who played for the Edmonton Eskimos and BC Lions. He won the Grey Cup with the Lions in 1964. He played college football at Wenatchee Valley College.
