= Community Colleges of Spokane =

Community college district in Spokane, Washington, U.S.

- Motto: Inspire. Enrich. Uplift.
- Type: Public community college
- Established: 1963; 63 years ago
- Chancellor: Kevin Brockbank
- Students: 28,744
- Location: Spokane, Washington, United States
- Conference: Northwest Athletic Conference (NWAC)
- Mascot: Skitch the Sasquatch
- Website: www.ccs.spokane.edu

Community Colleges of Spokane is a community college district based in Spokane, Washington. Established in 1963, CCS serves over 28,000 students a year, spread across a 12,300-square-mile (32,000 km^{2}) service district in Eastern Washington. It comprises Spokane Community College and Spokane Falls Community College.

== Spokane Community College ==
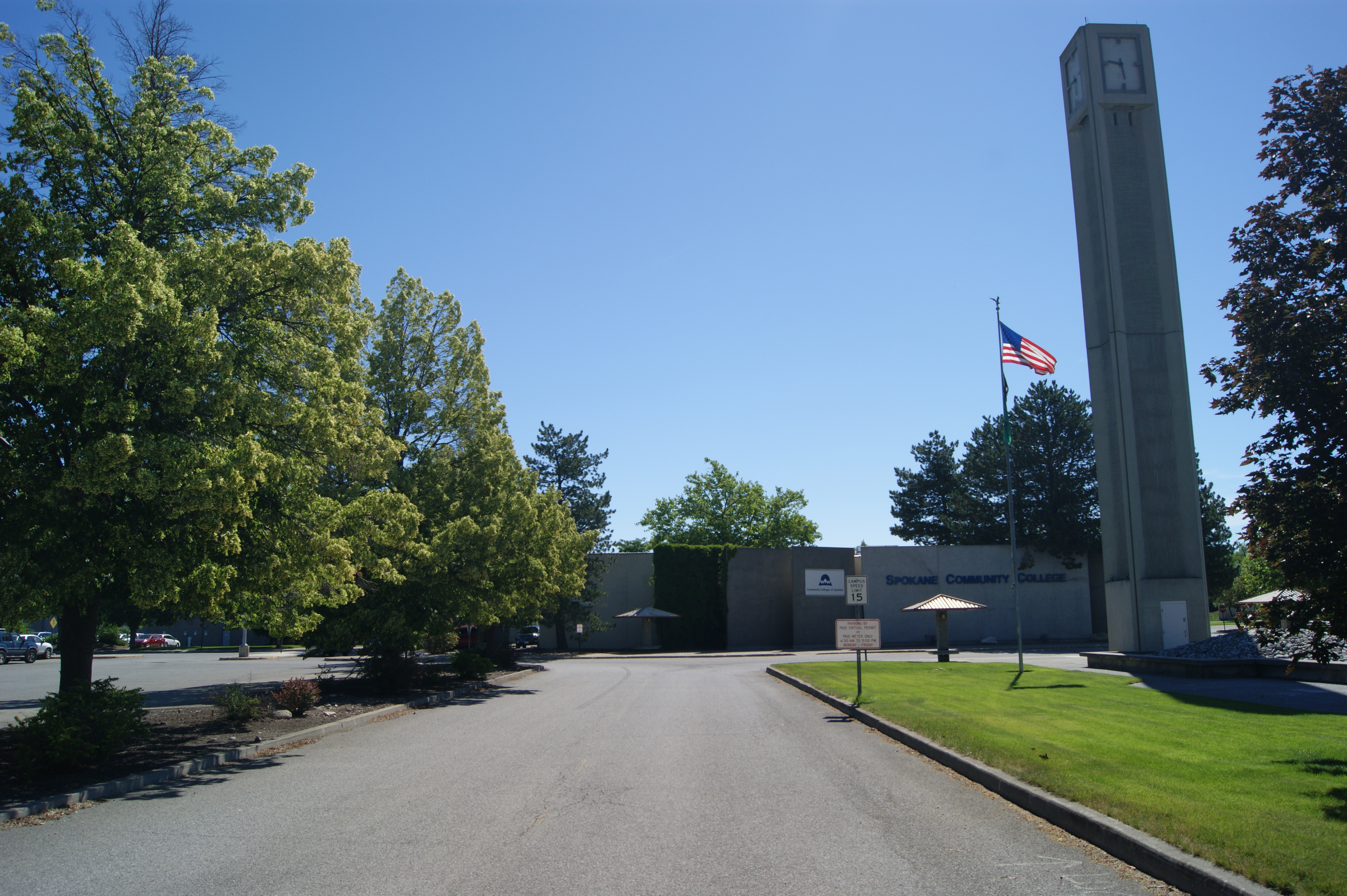
Spokane Community College

Established in 1963, Spokane Community College, or SCC, is a comprehensive educational institution meeting the needs of students and business and industry throughout Eastern Washington and the Intermountain West. SCC provides two-year transfer degrees to four-year colleges and universities and also has over 60 career-technical degree and certificate programs in manufacturing, transportation, building trades, environmental science, business, information technology, public safety, hospitality and culinary arts.

SCC's health sciences division is the largest among Washington's community and technical colleges. In 2012–13, the community colleges' Institute for Extended Learning merged with SCC, expanding its program offerings to include Adult Basic Education, GED, ESL, and High School Completion. In addition, SCC has a center for workforce training and continuing education, and a program offering education classes for adults age 50 and older. SCC also has rural education centers in Colville, Inchelium, Ione, Newport, and Republic, Washington.

== Spokane Falls Community College ==
The college, commonly known as The Falls, opened in 1967. Spokane Falls Community College offers programs for students seeking an associate of arts or associate of science transfer degree, with some 60 percent enrolled in transfer degree programs. SFCC also offers many one-of-kind career-technical programs including orthotic/prosthetic technician, hearing instrument specialist, physical therapist assistant and occupational therapy assistant (starting fall 2011). The college also is considered a center of visual and performing arts, with highly regarding programs in drama, music, fine art, photography and graphic design.

SFCC has a close working relationship with the Mukogawa Fort Wright Institute, a higher education facility adjacent to the campus for students from Japan studying in the U.S. The college also has education centers at Fairchild Air Force Base and in Pullman.

== Athletics ==
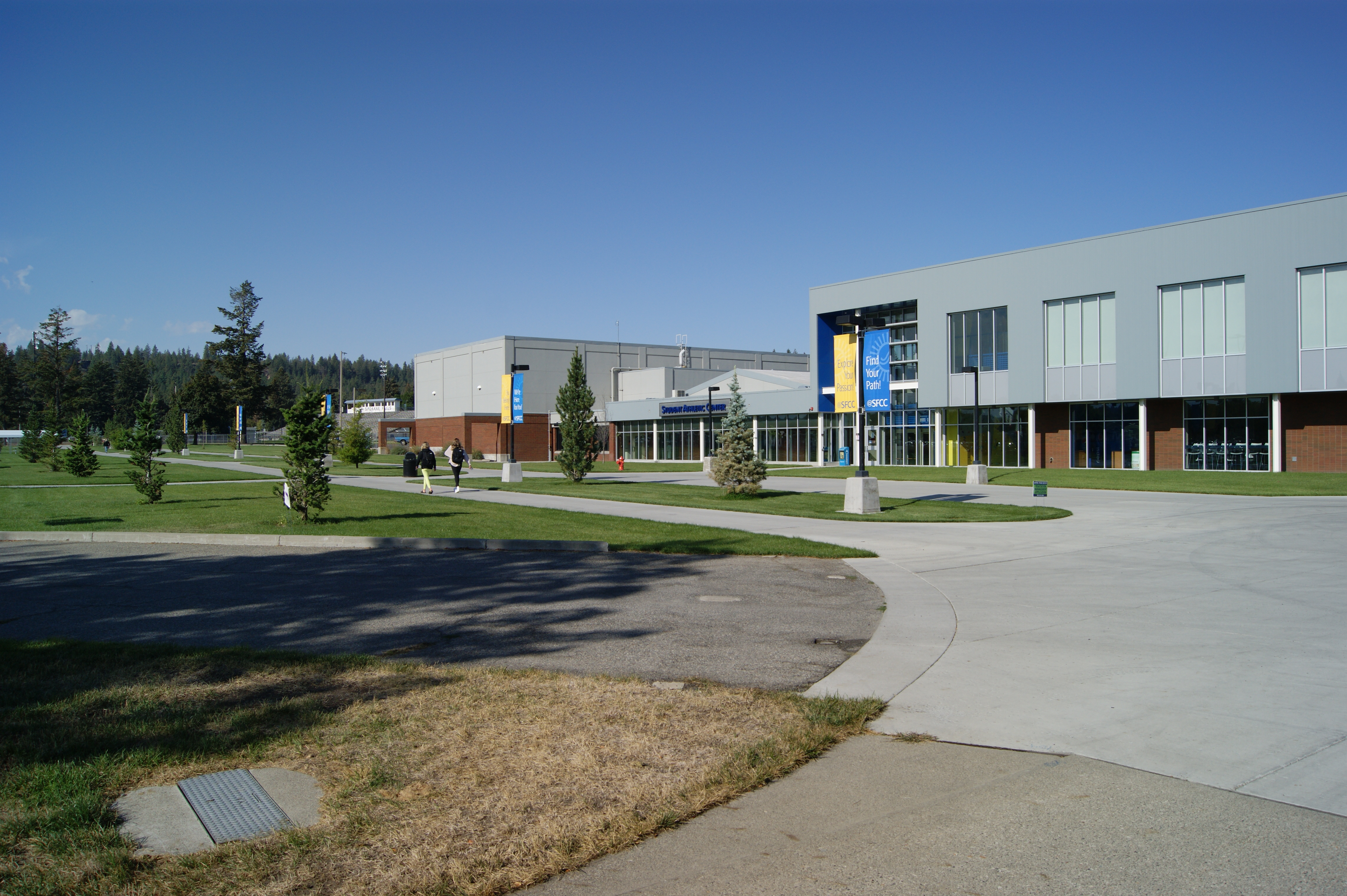
The Student Athletic Center and SFCC Stadium on the SFCC campus

SCC and SFCC have a combined intercollegiate sports program, competing in the Northwest Athletic Association of Community Colleges East Region as the Community Colleges of Spokane Sasquatch (also referred to as the Bigfoot). Sports include soccer (men/women), cross country (men/women), volleyball (women), basketball (men/women), track and field (men/women), tennis (men/women), golf (men/women), baseball (men) and softball (women).
