= Spokane Falls Community College =

College in Spokane, Washington, U.S.

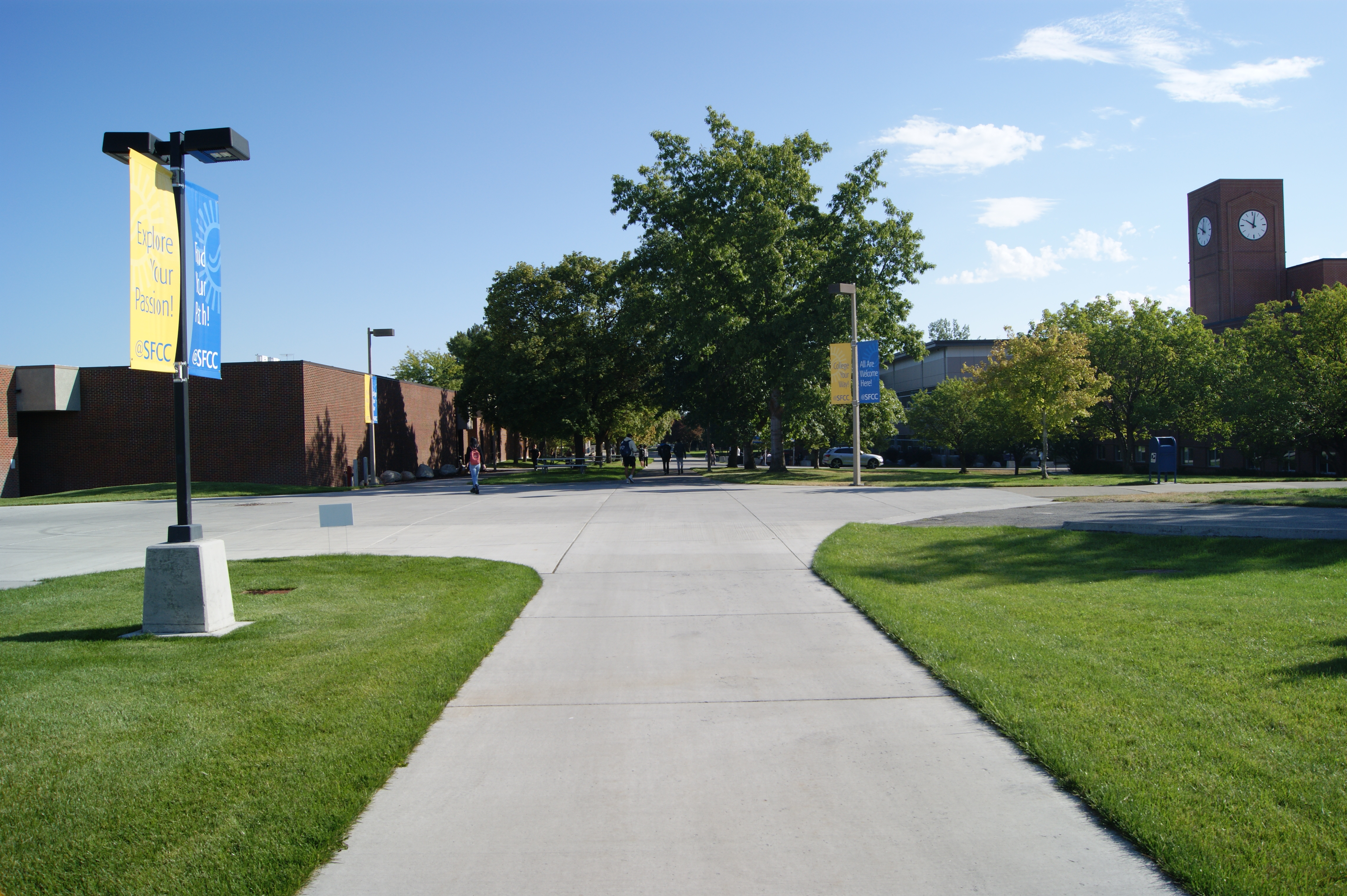
- Looking north at the south end of the campus
- Former name: Spokane Community College Fort Wright Campus
- Type: Public community college
- Established: 1967
- Parent institution: Community Colleges of Spokane
- President: Kevin Brockbank
- Students: 3,805
- Location: Spokane, Washington, U.S. 47°40′36″N 117°27′52″W
- Campus: Urban, 113 acres (46 ha)
- Colors: Blue and gold
- Nickname: Bigfoot
- Sporting affiliations: Northwest Athletic Conference
- Mascot: Skitch
- Website: sfcc.spokanefalls.edu

Spokane Falls Community College (SFCC) is a public community college in Spokane, Washington. Established in 1967, it is a part of the Community Colleges of Spokane. SFCC enrolls approximately 3,805 students and has an open admission policy with a 100% acceptance rate and no application fee.

== History ==
The land where Spokane Falls Community College (SFCC) now is located was originally given to Spokane after the U.S. Government declared Fort George Wright to be surplus. In 1960, it was proposed that a college be built upon the site. Seven years later, in 1967, SFCC was established on the site as part of Spokane Community College, originally located in the Chief Garry Park neighborhood four years prior, in 1963. In 1970, the two campuses split into two separate colleges, though they maintain a cooperative approach.

The original campus had eight new buildings made for different purposes including, administration, physical and natural sciences, library, social sciences, business sciences, communications, fine arts, and a gym. The 1965 campus plans included outlines for four future buildings and retained seven existing structures from the old Fort Wright campus, one of which would later be designated as the Photography Building. The eight new buildings were built in a consistent Modern architectural style, characteristic of the mid-20th century. Common design elements across these buildings included repetitive bays, brick walls with aluminum window frames, and distinctively wide, wavy concrete eaves.

== Campus ==
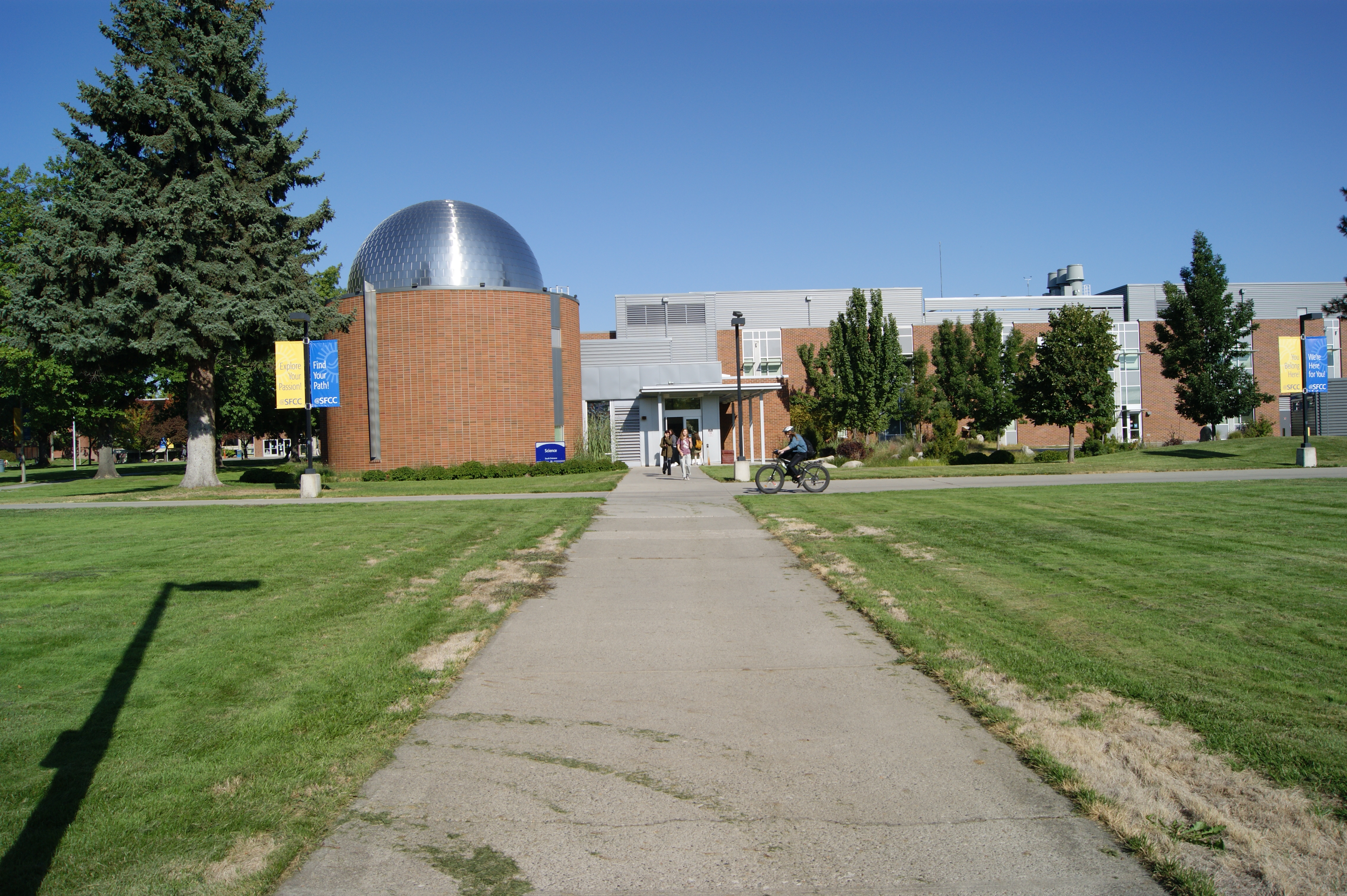
Building 28, the Science Building and planetarium

The campus is located on what was once Fort George Wright, a U.S. Army base from the late 1800s until the post-World War II era, in the West Hills neighborhood of Spokane. It is adjacent to the U.S. Campus of Mukogawa Women's University, which unlike SFCC has retained the historic buildings from the Fort Wright days. It's just southwest of the T.J. Meenach Bridge.

Both the Spokane Falls Community College campus and the Community College of Spokane are located on a relatively flat tableland surrounded by a bend in the Spokane River, which cuts a deep ridge to the south, east and north. The Spokane River Centennial Trail runs along the river on the northern edge of campus. The campus is home to about two dozen buildings used for education, most of which are clustered together with grass areas and walkways between them, though some are located among the parking lots which surround the center of campus.

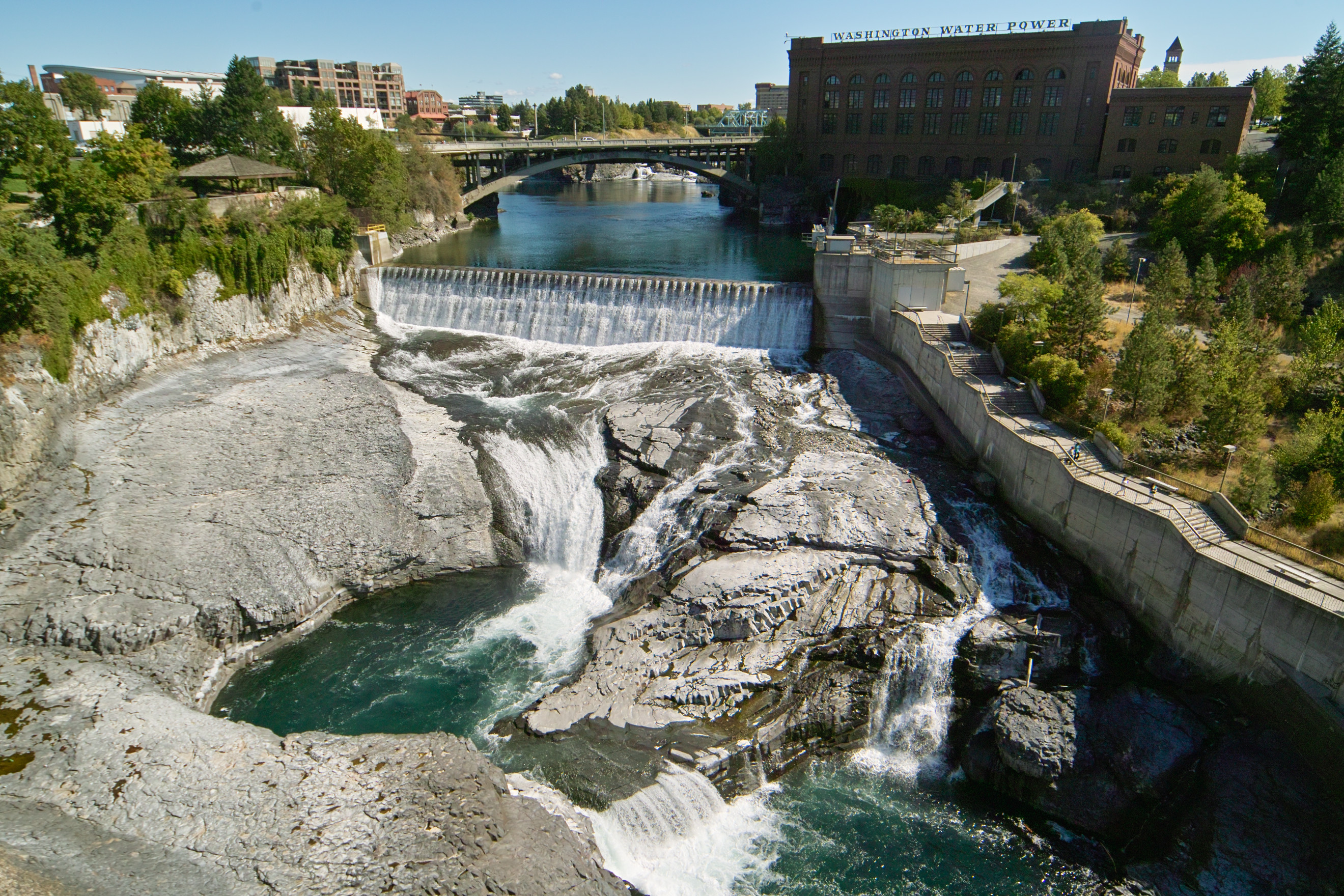
The iconic Spokane Falls, which the college gets its name from.

Both campuses experienced a rise in annual student enrollment in 2024; however, according to the associated press, the majority of community colleges in the US have been declining in yearly enrollment at this time. SCC's president, Kevin Brockbank, attributes this growth to the grants and services provided by the college. These initiatives are designed to alleviate common challenges faced by community college students, including managing full-time work while studying, affording childcare, and accessing mental health resources.

== Demographics ==
In 2021, the most frequently Associate Degree programs were Liberal Arts and Sciences with 703 degrees, followed by General Business with 38 degrees, and Early Childhood Education and Teaching with 37 degrees.

During the same year, Spokane Falls Community College issued 1,209 degrees. Women received 63.9% of these degrees, while men received 36.1%. The predominant racial or ethnic group among graduates was White, who received 785 degrees, significantly outnumbering the next largest group, Hispanic or Latino students, who received 104 degrees.

The median tuition for undergraduates at Spokane Falls Community College was $3,029 in 2021, which is $4,939 less than the national average for Associate Colleges ($7,968).

== Student experience ==
SFCC differs from its sister college Spokane Community College (SCC) in that SFCC has a younger average student age compared to SCC . SFCC can offer a typical college experience. Amenities and activities are available on campus. The college has apartment-style housing, opportunities for involvement in campus activities such as sports, the campus newspaper, and politics, and many courses that help prepare students for life after college, such as budgeting classes.

SFCC's courses have students of all ages, from high school juniors, seniors, and recent graduates to adult learners. The college's Running Start program enables high school students to earn college credits at SFCC.

== Student and community resources ==
SFCC has resources that are for students and the wider community. On campus, there are some Fine Arts Studios, such as a Ceramics Studio, Drawing and Painting Studio, Printmaking Studio, and a Sculpture Studio. SFCC's Art Gallery shows traditional and nontraditional exhibitions, these are free and open to the public.

There are about 32 Computer Labs available to all SFCC students. There are two fitness centers, one at SFCC and the other at Spokane Community College (SCC).

The Music Building at SFCC has quarterly music concerts, that the community can attend, in the auditorium. SFCC students and the community can participate in the music ensembles. The music building has a recording studio, Yamaha Clavinova Digital Keyboard Lab, and a Music Midi-Lab.

SFCC's Planetarium offers public, educational presentations. In the 2023-24 season, the Planetarium saw over 3,000 students and their teachers through over 75 presentations.

== Transportation ==
Bus routes 33 and 36 stop near SFCC, with the nearest stop located at SFCC Station Bay 1, this is a two-minute walk from campus. Students can use their ID cards as bus passes; alternatively, the bus fare to SFCC is approximately $2.00. Other transportation options include cycling, because it's on the centennial trail, driving, or walking if you lived close to the campus, such as in the College Terrace Apartments.

== Athletics ==
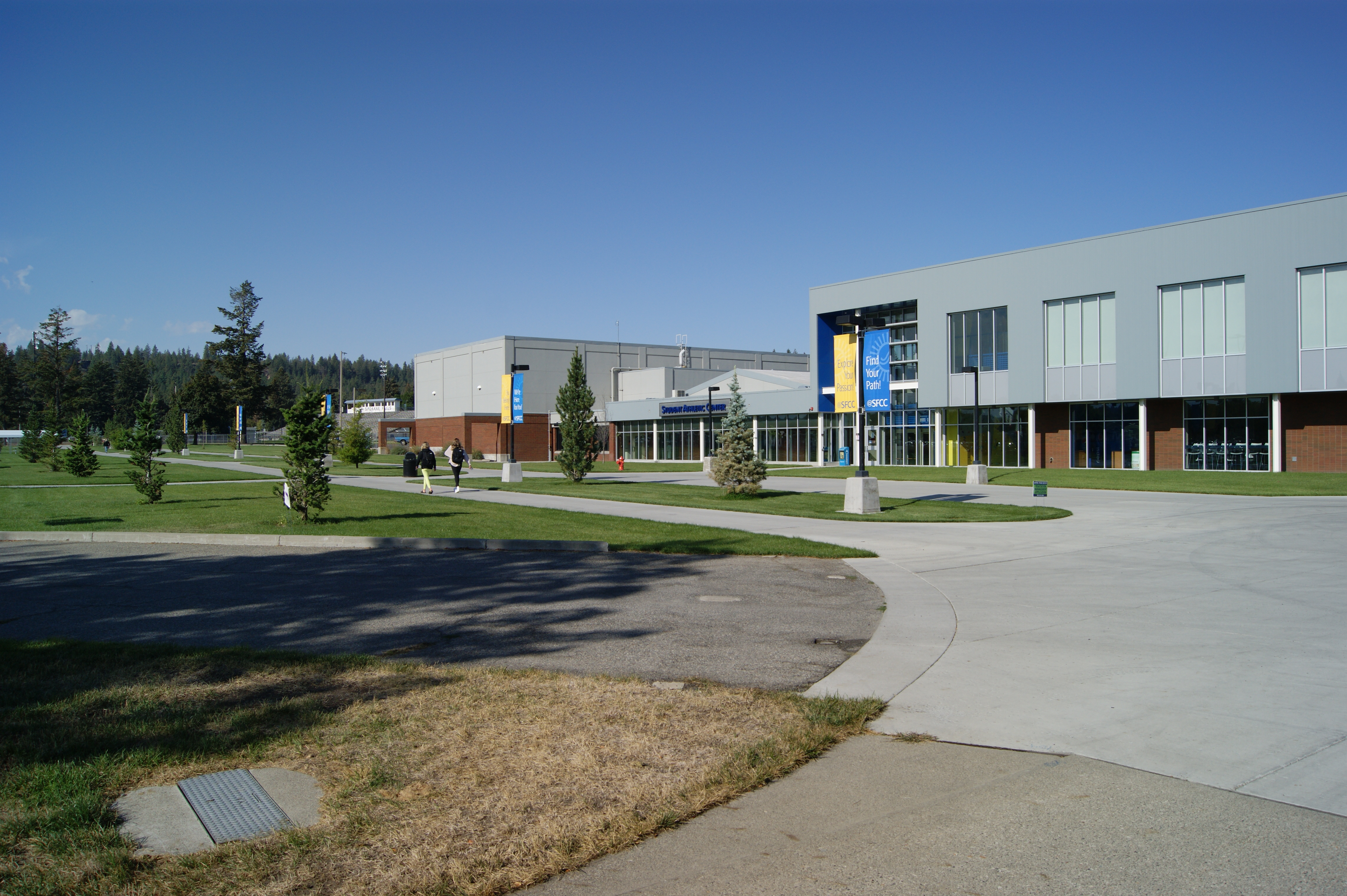
The Student Athletic Center

SFCC partners with Spokane Community College as the Community Colleges of Spokane, using the team name the Sasquatch. They compete in the Northwest Athletic Conference (NWAC). The official colors are blue and gold. SFCC has 15 different sports teams; including, Baseball, Men's Basketball, Women's Basketball, Men's Cross Country, Women's Cross Country, Men's Golf, Women's Golf, Men's Soccer, Women's Soccer, Softball, Men's Tennis, Women's Tennis, Men's Track & Field, Women's Track & Field, and Volleyball.

== Notable alumni ==
- Sharon Calahan, director of photography for films including A Bug's Life, Toy Story 2, and Finding Nemo
- Dan O'Brien, Olympic athlete
- Myles Kennedy, musician and songwriter
- Todd Mcfarlane, comic book writer
