= Northwest Athletic Conference =

Sports association for community colleges

- Formerly: Northwest Athletic Association of Community Colleges
- Conference: None
- Founded: 1946; 80 years ago
- Commissioner: Marco Azurdia
- Sports fielded: 15; men's: 6; women's: 7
- No. of teams: 37
- Headquarters: Longview, Washington, U.S.
- Region: Pacific Northwest

The Northwest Athletic Conference (NWAC), formerly the Northwest Athletic Association of Community Colleges (NWAACC), is a non-profit two-year college conference for community colleges in the U.S. states of Oregon and Washington, along with the Canadian province of British Columbia.

The NWAC, now with 37 members, is the largest community college conference in the United States. It is not affiliated with the National Junior College Athletic Association (NJCAA), but acknowledges on the NWAC website athletes representing conference schools in the NJCAA wrestling tournament.

== History ==
The NWAC ("En-Wack") was originally formed in 1946 as the Washington State Junior College Athletic Conference (WSJCAC). In 1961, the State Legislature removed a legal roadblock that had barred the establishment of junior colleges in counties with four-year colleges. After the Legislature took action, the number of schools in the WSJCAC nearly doubled. Three years later, the conference was renamed the Washington Athletic Association of Community Colleges (WAACC).

In 1970 the conference admitted its first non-Washington member, Mt. Hood Community College of Gresham, Oregon, which had left the Oregon Community College Athletic Association (OCCAA). At that time, the WAACC became the Northwest AACC, reflecting its two-state membership.

The NWAACC merged with its Oregon counterpart in 1983, resulting in a 26-member circuit stretching from southwestern Oregon to the Canada–US border.

On July 1, 2014, the conference announced that they were becoming the Northwest Athletic Conference.

=== 1946: WSJCAC birth ===
Although athletic competition between junior colleges existed in the 1930s, the first structured league and championship events in men's sports came in 1946 when the Washington State Junior College Athletic Conference (WSJCAC) was formed. Following the nine charter members, Columbia Basin College joined in 1955.

Initially, the conference offered football, basketball, baseball, tennis, track and golf. In 1963 wrestling was added, followed by cross country in 1965 and soccer in 1974.

The WSJCAC existed without bylaws until the spring of 1948, when Executive Secretary Jim Ennis of Everett JC, Dave DuVall of Skagit Valley and Maury Phipps of Grays Harbor, wrote the conference's original constitution. The document set forth the overall philosophy of the conference's athletic program, and prescribed scholarship limits and grade eligibility requirements.

=== 1963: birth of Oregon's conference ===
In 1963, five Oregon schools joined to form the Oregon Community College Athletic Association (OCCAA). Charter members were Blue Mountain, Central Oregon, Clatsop, Southwestern Oregon and Treasure Valley community colleges. The conference more than doubled in size in the 1968–69 school year, when Chemeketa, Clackamas, Lane, Linn-Benton, Mt. Hood, Portland and Umpqua community colleges joined the circuit.

=== 1970s: the NWAACC and the rise of women's athletics ===
During the 1970s, the newly renamed NWAACC saw the growth of women's sports at its member institutions. Women's athletics were governed by the Northwest College Women's Sports Association (NCWSA) until 1978, when the NCWSA was absorbed by the NWAACC.

Volunteer athletic directors had overseen conference functions and activities until the addition of women's athletics. The subsequent increased workload caused the NWAACC to convene a five-member hiring committee, which in 1979 appointed Frank Bosone as the conference's first executive director. Bosone retired in 1992 and was succeeded by Dick McClain, a longtime baseball coach in Corvallis, Oregon.

=== 1983: merger ===
Community college athletics in the Pacific Northwest changed dramatically in 1983, when seven OCCAA members joined the NWAACC. The merger between the Washington and Oregon colleges has helped the NWAACC become a strong organization. Since 1984, nine other colleges have added intercollegiate athletics and/or became NWAACC members.

=== 2014: renaming ===
The NWAACC was renamed the Northwest Athletic Conference on July 1, 2014 and has 36 member schools.

== Member schools ==
=== Current members ===
The NWAC currently has 37 full members, all are public schools:

Institution	Location	Founded	Affiliation	Enrollment	Nickname	Joined	Division
Bellevue College	Bellevue, Washington	1966	Public (Note: Part of the Washington Community and Technical Colleges system)	37,000	Bulldogs	?	Northern
Big Bend Community College	Moses Lake, Washington	1962	Public	5,400	Vikings	?	Eastern
Blue Mountain Community College	Pendleton, Oregon	1962	Public (Note: Part of the Oregon Community College Association.)	10,600	Timberwolves	1983 (Note: Charter member of the OCCAA.)	Eastern
Centralia College	Centralia, Washington	1925	Public	4,803	Trailblazers	1946 (Note: Charter member of the WSJCAC/WAACC/NWAACC/NWAC.)	Western
Chemeketa Community College	Salem, Oregon	1969	Public	50,000	Storm	1983	Southern
Clackamas Community College	Oregon City, Oregon	1966	Public	25,029	Cougars	1983	Southern
Clark College	Vancouver, Washington	1933	Public	14,000	Penguins	1946	Western
Columbia Basin College	Pasco, Washington	1955	Public	13,000	Hawks	1955	Eastern
Columbia Gorge Community College	The Dalles, Oregon	1977	Public	1,039	Chinooks	2024	Eastern
Douglas College	New Westminster, British Columbia	1971	Public	25,000	Royals	?	Northern
Edmonds College	Edmonds, Washington	1967	Public	12,000	Tritons	?	Northern
Everett Community College	Everett, Washington	1941	Public	19,666	Trojans	1946	Northern
Grays Harbor College	Aberdeen, Washington	1930	Public	2,088	Chokers	1946	Western
Green River College (Note: Formerly known as Green River Community College until 2014.)	Auburn, Washington	1963	Public	9,212	Gators	?	Western
Highline College	Des Moines, Washington	1961	Public	18,993	Thunderbirds	?	Western
Klamath Community College	Klamath Falls, Oregon	1996	Public		Badgers	2025	Southern
Lane Community College	Eugene, Oregon	1964	Public	18,678	Titans	1983	Southern
Linn–Benton Community College	Albany, Oregon	1966	Public	12,360	Roadrunners	1983	Southern
Lower Columbia College	Longview, Washington	1934	Public	8,465	Red Devils	1946	Western
Mt. Hood Community College	Gresham, Oregon	1966	Public	8,370	Saints	1970	Southern
Olympic College	Bremerton, Washington	1946	Public	12,285	Rangers	1946	Northern
Peninsula College	Port Angeles, Washington	1961	Public	10,000	Pirates	?	Northern
Pierce College (Note: Formerly known as Fort Steilacoom Community College until 1986.)	Lakewood, Washington	1967	Public	21,643	Raiders	?	Western
Portland Community College	Portland, Oregon	1961	Public	50,000	Panthers	?	Southern
Rogue Community College	Grants Pass, Oregon	1970	Public	?	Ospreys	?	Southern
Shoreline Community College	Shoreline, Washington	1964	Public	13,795	Dolphins	?	Northern
Skagit Valley College	Mount Vernon, Washington	1926	Public	5,136	Cardinals	1946	Northern
South Puget Sound Community College	Olympia, Washington	1962	Public	4,665	Clippers	?	Western
Southwestern Oregon Community College	Coos Bay, Oregon	1941	Public	14,500	Lakers	1983	Southern
Spokane Colleges	Spokane, Washington	1963	Public	38,600	Sasquatch	?	Eastern
Tacoma Community College	Tacoma, Washington	1965	Public	15,000	Titans	?	Western
Treasure Valley Community College	Ontario, Oregon	1962	Public	?	Chukars	?	Eastern
Umpqua Community College	Winchester, Oregon	1964	Public	13,300	Riverhawks	1983	Southern
Walla Walla Community College	Walla Walla, Washington	1967	Public	13,000	Warriors	?	Eastern
Wenatchee Valley College	Wenatchee, Washington	1939	Public	3,353	Knights	1946	Eastern
Whatcom Community College	Bellingham, Washington	1967	Public	11,457	Orcas	?	Northern
Yakima Valley College (Note: Formerly known as Yakima Valley Community College until 2022.)	Yakima, Washington	1941	Public	10,000	Yaks	1946	Eastern

North Idaho College - Officially left the NWAC in the beginning of the 2023-2024 athletic season with basketball teams being recognized as independent, then with the start of the 2024-2025 season the remaining sports all joined the NJCAA.

== Sports ==
The NWAC sponsors intercollegiate athletic competition in the following sports:

Conference sports
Sport	Men's	Women's
Baseball	✓	✗
Basketball	✓	✓
Cross country	✓	✓
Golf	✓	✓
Soccer	✓	✓
Softball	✗	✓
Track and field (outdoor)	✓	✓
Volleyball	✗	✓

== Yearly football standings ==
1947 Washington Junior College Conference football standings
	Conf.					Overall
Team	W		L		T	W		L		T
Everett $	8	–	0	–	0	9	–	0	–	0
Wenatchee Valley	5	–	2	–	1	?	–	?	–	?
Lower Columbia	5	–	3	–	0	?	–	?	–	?
Yakima Valley	4	–	2	–	2	?	–	?	–	?
Grays Harbor	4	–	4	–	0	?	–	?	–	?
Clark (WA)	3	–	4	–	1	?	–	?	–	?
Centralia	3	–	5	–	0	?	–	?	–	?
Mount Vernon	1	–	7	–	0	?	–	?	–	?
Olympic	1	–	7	–	0	?	–	?	–	?
$ – Conference champion

1948 Washington Junior College Conference football standings
	Conf.					Overall
Team	W		L		T	W		L		T
Everett $	7	–	1	–	0	8	–	2	–	0
Centralia	6	–	2	–	0	?	–	?	–	?
Grays Harbor	6	–	2	–	0	?	–	?	–	?
Lower Columbia	6	–	2	–	0	?	–	?	–	?
Olympic	3	–	4	–	1	?	–	?	–	?
Yakima Valley	3	–	4	–	1	?	–	?	–	?
Clark (WA)	2	–	6	–	0	?	–	?	–	?
Skagit Valley	2	–	6	–	0	?	–	?	–	?
Wenatchee Valley	0	–	8	–	0	?	–	?	–	?
$ – Conference champion

1949 Washington Junior College Conference football standings
	Conf.					Overall
Team	W		L		T	W		L		T
Everett +	7	–	1	–	0	?	–	?	–	?
Grays Harbor +	7	–	1	–	0	9	–	1	–	0
Olympic	6	–	1	–	0	?	–	?	–	?
Lower Columbia	4	–	3	–	0	?	–	?	–	?
Clark (WA)	4	–	4	–	0	?	–	?	–	?
Wenatchee Valley	3	–	5	–	0	?	–	?	–	?
Yakima Valley	2	–	5	–	1	?	–	?	–	?
Centralia	1	–	6	–	1	?	–	?	–	?
Skagit Valley	0	–	8	–	0	?	–	?	–	?
+ – Conference co-champions; The conference game between Olympic and Lower Columbia was ruled a no contest.

1950 Washington Junior College Conference football standings
	Conf.					Overall
Team	W		L		T	W		L		T
Olympic $	7	–	0	–	0	10	–	0	–	0
Clark (WA)	5	–	2	–	0	?	–	?	–	?
Everett	4	–	2	–	1	5	–	3	–	2
Centralia	2	–	2	–	3	?	–	?	–	?
Grays Harbor	3	–	3	–	1	?	–	?	–	?
Wenatchee Valley	2	–	5	–	0	?	–	?	–	?
Yakima Valley	1	–	4	–	2	?	–	?	–	?
Lower Columbia	0	–	6	–	1	?	–	?	–	?
$ – Conference champion

1951 Washington Junior College Conference football standings
	Conf.					Overall
Team	W		L		T	W		L		T
Olympic $	7	–	0	–	0	8	–	1	–	2
Lower Columbia	6	–	1	–	0	?	–	?	–	?
Everett	4	–	2	–	1	?	–	?	–	?
Grays Harbor	4	–	3	–	0	?	–	?	–	?
Yakima Valley	3	–	3	–	1	?	–	?	–	?
Centralia	2	–	5	–	0	?	–	?	–	?
Clark (WA)	1	–	6	–	0	?	–	?	–	?
Wenatchee Valley	0	–	7	–	0	?	–	?	–	?
$ – Conference champion

1952 Washington Junior College Conference football standings
	Conf.					Overall
Team	W		L		T	W		L		T
Everett $	6	–	0	–	0	10	–	0	–	0
Grays Harbor	5	–	1	–	0	?	–	?	–	?
Olympic	4	–	2	–	0	?	–	?	–	?
Lower Columbia	3	–	3	–	0	4	–	5	–	0
Yakima Valley	1	–	4	–	0	?	–	?	–	?
Wenatchee Valley	0	–	4	–	1	?	–	?	–	?
Centralia	0	–	5	–	1	?	–	?	–	?
$ – Conference champion

1953 Washington Junior College Conference football standings
	Conf.					Overall
Team	W		L		T	W		L		T
Everett $	6	–	0	–	0	6	–	1	–	1
Olympic	4	–	2	–	0	?	–	?	–	?
Centralia	3	–	2	–	1	?	–	?	–	?
Grays Harbor	3	–	3	–	0	?	–	?	–	?
Lower Columbia	2	–	4	–	0	?	–	?	–	?
Wenatchee Valley	2	–	4	–	0	?	–	?	–	?
Yakima Valley	0	–	5	–	1	?	–	?	–	?
$ – Conference champion

1954 Washington Junior College Conference football standings
	Conf.					Overall
Team	W		L		T	W		L		T
Everett $	6	–	0	–	0	7	–	1	–	0
Olympic	4	–	1	–	1	?	–	?	–	?
Centralia	3	–	2	–	1	?	–	?	–	?
Grays Harbor	3	–	2	–	1	?	–	?	–	?
Lower Columbia	2	–	3	–	1	?	–	?	–	?
Yakima Valley	1	–	5	–	0	?	–	?	–	?
Wenatchee Valley	0	–	6	–	0	?	–	?	–	?
$ – Conference champion

1955 Washington Junior College Conference football standings
	Conf.					Overall
Team	W		L		T	W		L		T
Wenatchee Valley $	5	–	0	–	1	7	–	1	–	1
Everett	4	–	2	–	0	6	–	2	–	0
Grays Harbor	3	–	2	–	1	?	–	?	–	?
Lower Columbia	3	–	3	–	0	5	–	3	–	0
Yakima Valley	3	–	3	–	0	?	–	?	–	?
Olympic	2	–	4	–	0	?	–	?	–	?
Centralia	0	–	6	–	0	?	–	?	–	?
$ – Conference champion

1956 Washington Junior College Conference football standings
	Conf.					Overall
Team	W		L		T	W		L		T
Wenatchee Valley $	6	–	1	–	0	?	–	?	–	?
Grays Harbor	5	–	1	–	1	?	–	?	–	?
Olympic	4	–	2	–	1	?	–	?	–	?
Yakima Valley	3	–	3	–	1	?	–	?	–	?
Everett	3	–	4	–	0	?	–	?	–	?
Centralia	1	–	4	–	2	?	–	?	–	?
Lower Columbia	1	–	4	–	2	?	–	?	–	?
Columbia Basin	1	–	5	–	1	?	–	?	–	?
$ – Conference champion

1957 Washington Junior College Conference football standings
	Conf.					Overall
Team	W		L		T	W		L		T
Olympic +	6	–	1	–	0	8	–	2	–	0
Wenatchee Valley +	6	–	1	–	0	?	–	?	–	?
Everett	5	–	1	–	1	?	–	?	–	?
Yakima Valley	4	–	2	–	1	?	–	?	–	?
Centralia	2	–	5	–	0	?	–	?	–	?
Grays Harbor	2	–	5	–	0	?	–	?	–	?
Columbia Basin	1	–	6	–	0	?	–	?	–	?
Lower Columbia	1	–	6	–	0	?	–	?	–	?
+ – Conference co-champions

1958 Washington Junior College Conference football standings
	Conf.					Overall
Team	W		L		T	W		L		T
Olympic $	5	–	0	–	1	6	–	2	–	1
Wenatchee Valley	4	–	2	–	0	6	–	2	–	0
Grays Harbor	4	–	2	–	0	5	–	3	–	0
Everett	3	–	2	–	1	5	–	3	–	1
Lower Columbia	2	–	4	–	0	3	–	5	–	0
Yakima Valley	2	–	4	–	0	3	–	5	–	0
Columbia Basin	0	–	6	–	0	1	–	7	–	0
$ – Conference champion

1959 Washington Junior College Conference football standings
	Conf.					Overall
Team	W		L		T	W		L		T
Wenatchee Valley $	5	–	0	–	1	7	–	0	–	1
Columbia Basin	5	–	1	–	0	8	–	1	–	0
Olympic	3	–	3	–	0	3	–	5	–	0
Everett	2	–	3	–	1	4	–	3	–	1
Lower Columbia	2	–	3	–	1	4	–	3	–	1
Yakima Valley	1	–	3	–	2	3	–	3	–	2
Grays Harbor	0	–	5	–	1	2	–	5	–	1
$ – Conference champion

1960 Washington Junior College Conference football standings
	Conf.					Overall
Team	W		L		T	W		L		T
Everett $	5	–	1	–	0	5	–	1	–	0
Yakima Valley	3	–	1	–	2	4	–	1	–	2
Grays Harbor	4	–	2	–	0	4	–	2	–	0
Columbia Basin	3	–	2	–	1	4	–	2	–	1
Olympic	2	–	3	–	1	2	–	4	–	1
Wenatchee Valley	2	–	4	–	0	4	–	4	–	0
Lower Columbia	0	–	6	–	0	0	–	7	–	0
$ – Conference champion

1961 Washington Junior College Conference football standings
	Conf.					Overall
Team	W		L		T	W		L		T
Columbia Basin $	6	–	0	–	0	9	–	0	–	0
Olympic	4	–	2	–	0	5	–	4	–	0
Everett	3	–	2	–	1	4	–	4	–	1
Grays Harbor	3	–	2	–	1	3	–	4	–	1
Wenatchee Valley	2	–	4	–	0	4	–	4	–	0
Yakima	2	–	4	–	0	4	–	5	–	0
Lower Columbia	0	–	6	–	0	2	–	6	–	0
$ – Conference champion

1962 Washington Junior College Conference football standings
	Conf.					Overall
Team	W		L		T	W		L		T
Columbia Basin $	5	–	0	–	1	7	–	1	–	1
Wenatchee Valley	4	–	0	–	2	8	–	0	–	2
Yakima	3	–	3	–	0	4	–	4	–	0
Olympic	3	–	3	–	0	3	–	4	–	1
Grays Harbor	2	–	3	–	1	2	–	5	–	1
Everett	2	–	4	–	0	3	–	4	–	1
Lower Columbia	0	–	6	–	0	1	–	7	–	0
$ – Conference champion

1963 Washington Junior College Conference football standings
	Conf.					Overall
Team	W		L		T	W		L		T
Columbia Basin $	5	–	0	–	0	8	–	0	–	1
Olympic	3	–	2	–	0	6	–	3	–	0
Grays Harbor	3	–	2	–	0	5	–	3	–	0
Everett	2	–	3	–	0	2	–	6	–	0
Yakima	1	–	4	–	0	4	–	4	–	0
Wenatchee Valley	1	–	4	–	0	2	–	7	–	0
$ – Conference champion

1964 Washington Junior College Conference football standings
	Conf.					Overall
Team	W		L		T	W		L		T
Columbia Basin +	5	–	1	–	0	7	–	1	–	0
Yakima +	5	–	1	–	0	7	–	1	–	0
Grays Harbor	4	–	2	–	0	7	–	2	–	0
Everett	2	–	3	–	1	4	–	4	–	1
Wenatchee Valley	2	–	4	–	0	3	–	5	–	0
Olympic	1	–	3	–	2	3	–	4	–	2
Shoreline	0	–	5	–	1	1	–	7	–	1
+ – Conference co-champions

1965 Washington Junior College Conference football standings
	Conf.					Overall
Team	W		L		T	W		L		T
Columbia Basin $	6	–	0	–	0	9	–	0	–	0
Wenatchee Valley	4	–	2	–	0	4	–	3	–	1
Shoreline	3	–	2	–	1	3	–	5	–	1
Grays Harbor	3	–	3	–	0	5	–	3	–	1
Yakima	2	–	3	–	1	3	–	3	–	2
Everett	2	–	4	–	0	2	–	7	–	0
Olympic	0	–	6	–	0	0	–	8	–	0
$ – Conference champion

1966 Washington Junior College Conference football standings
	Conf.					Overall
Team	W		L		T	W		L		T
Everett +	5	–	0	–	1	7	–	1	–	1
Columbia Basin +	5	–	0	–	1	6	–	2	–	1
Grays Harbor	3	–	2	–	1	7	–	2	–	1
Shoreline	3	–	2	–	1	3	–	5	–	1
Yakima	2	–	4	–	0	2	–	7	–	0
Wenatchee Valley	1	–	5	–	0	3	–	6	–	0
Olympic	0	–	6	–	0	2	–	8	–	0
+ – Conference co-champions

1967 Washington Community College Conference football standings
	Conf.					Overall
Team	W		L		T	W		L		T
Everett $	6	–	1	–	0	6	–	3	–	0
Grays Harbor	5	–	2	–	0	7	–	2	–	0
Columbia Basin	4	–	3	–	0	4	–	5	–	0
Olympic	4	–	3	–	0	4	–	5	–	0
Yakima	3	–	3	–	1	3	–	5	–	1
Spokane	3	–	4	–	0	3	–	6	–	0
Wenatchee Valley	1	–	5	–	1	2	–	6	–	1
Shoreline	1	–	6	–	0	2	–	7	–	0
$ – Conference champion

1968 Washington Community College Conference football standings
	Conf.					Overall
Team	W		L		T	W		L		T
Spokane $	7	–	0	–	0	8	–	0	–	0
Everett	5	–	1	–	1	7	–	1	–	1
Grays Harbor	4	–	3	–	0	5	–	4	–	0
Columbia Basin	3	–	3	–	1	4	–	4	–	1
Wenatchee Valley	3	–	4	–	0	4	–	5	–	0
Yakima	2	–	4	–	1	2	–	6	–	1
Shoreline	2	–	5	–	0	2	–	7	–	0
Olympic	0	–	6	–	1	1	–	7	–	1
$ – Conference champion

1969 Washington Community College Conference football standings
	Conf.					Overall
Team	W		L		T	W		L		T
Eastern Division
Spokane Falls xy	5	–	1	–	0	7	–	3	–	0
Yakima	5	–	1	–	0	6	–	3	–	0
Columbia Basin	3	–	3	–	0	5	–	2	–	0
Wenatchee Valley	0	–	6	–	0	0	–	9	–	0
Western Division
Grays Harbor xy$	5	–	1	–	0	8	–	2	–	0
Olympic	2	–	4	–	0	3	–	6	–	0
Everett	1	–	5	–	0	4	–	5	–	0
WCCC championship game: Grays Harbor 16, Spokane Falls 12
$ – Conference champion; x – Division champion/co-champions; y – Championship game participant

1970 Northwest Community College Conference football standings
	Conf.					Overall
Team	W		L		T	W		L		T
Eastern Division
Columbia Basin xy$	7	–	1	–	0	9	–	1	–	0
Spokane Falls	5	–	3	–	0	6	–	3	–	0
Yakima	5	–	3	–	0	6	–	3	–	0
Walla Walla	2	–	6	–	0	3	–	6	–	0
Wenatchee Valley	2	–	6	–	0	3	–	6	–	0
Western Division
Grays Harbor xy	7	–	1	–	0	8	–	2	–	0
Everett	5	–	3	–	0	5	–	4	–	0
Mt. Hood	2	–	6	–	0	2	–	7	–	0
Olympic	1	–	7	–	0	2	–	7	–	0
NWCCC championship game: Columbia Basin 26, Grays Harbor 14
$ – Conference champion; x – Division champion/co-champions; y – Championship game participant

1971 Northwest Community College Conference football standings
	Conf.					Overall
Team	W		L		T	W		L		T
Eastern Division
Wenatchee Valley xy$	7	–	1	–	0	9	–	1	–	0
Columbia Basin	5	–	2	–	0	6	–	2	–	1
Spokane Falls	5	–	3	–	0	6	–	3	–	0
Yakima	3	–	5	–	0	3	–	6	–	0
Walla Walla	1	–	7	–	0	2	–	7	–	0
Western Division
Grays Harbor xy	5	–	2	–	1	6	–	3	–	1
Mt. Hood	5	–	3	–	0	6	–	3	–	0
Olympic	3	–	3	–	2	3	–	4	–	2
Everett	0	–	8	–	0	1	–	8	–	0
NWCCC championship game: Wenatchee Valley 35, Grays Harbor 14
$ – Conference champion; x – Division champion/co-champions; y – Championship game participant

1972 Northwest Community College Conference football standings
	Conf.					Overall
Team	W		L		T	W		L		T
Eastern Division
Columbia Basin xy$	6	–	1	–	1	8	–	1	–	1
Spokane Falls	5	–	3	–	0	6	–	3	–	0
Walla Walla	3	–	3	–	2	4	–	3	–	2
Yakima	3	–	5	–	0	4	–	5	–	0
Wenatchee Valley	2	–	5	–	1	3	–	5	–	1
Western Division
Grays Harbor xy	6	–	2	–	0	7	–	3	–	0
Everett	4	–	4	–	0	5	–	4	–	0
Olympic	4	–	4	–	0	4	–	5	–	0
Mt. Hood	1	–	7	–	0	2	–	7	–	0
NWCCC championship game: Columbia Basin 26, Grays Harbor 13
$ – Conference champion; x – Division champion/co-champions; y – Championship game participant

1973 Northwest Community College Conference football standings
	Conf.					Overall
Team	W		L		T	W		L		T
Eastern Division
Spokane Falls xy$	6	–	1	–	1	8	–	1	–	1
Walla Walla	4	–	4	–	0	5	–	4	–	0
Wenatchee Valley	2	–	6	–	0	3	–	6	–	0
Yakima	2	–	6	–	0	2	–	7	–	0
Columbia Basin	1	–	7	–	0	1	–	8	–	0
Western Division
Everett xy	6	–	1	–	1	7	–	2	–	1
Mt. Hood	6	–	2	–	0	7	–	2	–	0
Grays Harbor	5	–	3	–	0	6	–	3	–	0
Olympic	3	–	5	–	0	4	–	5	–	0
NWCCC championship game: Spokane Falls 7, Everett 3
$ – Conference champion; x – Division champion/co-champions; y – Championship game participant

1974 Northwest Community College Conference football standings
	Conf.					Overall
Team	W		L		T	W		L		T
Eastern Division
Spokane Falls xy$	6	–	2	–	0	8	–	2	–	0
Walla Walla	5	–	3	–	0	6	–	3	–	0
Columbia Basin	3	–	5	–	0	3	–	6	–	0
Yakima	3	–	5	–	0	3	–	6	–	0
Wenatchee Valley	1	–	7	–	0	1	–	8	–	0
Western Division
Olympic xy	6	–	2	–	0	7	–	3	–	0
Grays Harbor	6	–	2	–	0	6	–	3	–	0
Mt. Hood	3	–	5	–	0	4	–	5	–	0
Everett	3	–	5	–	0	3	–	6	–	0
NWCCC championship game: Spokane Falls 7, Olympic 3
$ – Conference champion; x – Division champion/co-champions; y – Championship game participant

1975 Northwest Community College Conference football standings
	Conf.					Overall
Team	W		L		T	W		L		T
Eastern Division
Columbia Basin xy	5	–	3	–	0	6	–	3	–	0
Spokane Falls	4	–	4	–	0	5	–	4	–	0
Walla Walla	3	–	5	–	0	4	–	4	–	0
Wenatchee Valley	3	–	5	–	0	3	–	6	–	0
Yakima	0	–	8	–	0	0	–	9	–	0
Western Division
Mt. Hood xy$	8	–	0	–	0	10	–	0	–	0
Grays Harbor	6	–	2	–	0	7	–	2	–	0
Olympic	5	–	3	–	0	5	–	4	–	0
Everett	2	–	6	–	0	3	–	6	–	0
NWCCC championship game: Mt. Hood 12, Columbia Basin 8
$ – Conference champion; x – Division champion/co-champions; y – Championship game participant

1976 Northwest Community College Conference football standings
	Conf.					Overall
Team	W		L		T	W		L		T
Eastern Division
Spokane Falls xy$	6	–	3	–	0	7	–	3	–	0
Walla Walla	6	–	3	–	0	6	–	3	–	0
Columbia Basin	5	–	4	–	0	5	–	4	–	0
Wenatchee Valley	3	–	6	–	0	3	–	6	–	0
Yakima Valley	1	–	8	–	0	1	–	8	–	0
Western Division
Mt. Hood xy	9	–	0	–	0	9	–	1	–	0
Clackamas	5	–	4	–	0	5	–	4	–	0
Grays Harbor	5	–	4	–	0	5	–	4	–	0
Treasure Valley	3	–	6	–	0	3	–	6	–	0
Olympic	2	–	7	–	0	2	–	7	–	0
NWCCC championship game: Spokane Falls 19, Mt. Hood 7
$ – Conference champion; x – Division champion/co-champions; y – Championship game participant

1977 Northwest Community College Conference football standings
	Conf.					Overall
Team	W		L		T	W		L		T
Eastern Division
Columbia Basin xy	7	–	1	–	0	7	–	3	–	0
Yakima Valley	5	–	3	–	0	5	–	4	–	0
Spokane Falls	4	–	4	–	0	5	–	4	–	0
Wenatchee Valley	4	–	4	–	0	5	–	4	–	0
Walla Walla	4	–	4	–	0	4	–	5	–	0
Western Division
Mt. Hood xy$	7	–	1	–	0	8	–	1	–	0
Clackamas	3	–	5	–	0	3	–	5	–	0
Olympic	1	–	7	–	0	1	–	7	–	0
Treasure Valley	1	–	7	–	0	1	–	7	–	0
NWCCC championship game: Mt. Hood 21, Columbia Basin 6
$ – Conference champion; x – Division champion/co-champions; y – Championship game participant

1978 Northwest Community College Conference football standings
	Conf.					Overall
Team	W		L		T	W		L		T
Northern Division
Spokane Falls xy^	4	–	3	–	0	4	–	4	–	1
Wenatchee Valley	2	–	5	–	0	3	–	5	–	0
Yakima Valley	1	–	6	–	0	2	–	6	–	0
Olympic	1	–	6	–	0	1	–	7	–	0
Southern Division
Columbia Basin xy$^	7	–	0	–	0	10	–	0	–	0
Mt. Hood ^	6	–	1	–	0	7	–	3	–	0
Treasure Valley ^	4	–	3	–	0	4	–	5	–	0
Walla Walla	3	–	4	–	0	3	–	4	–	1
NWCCC championship game: Columbia Basin 20, Mt. Hood 10
$ – Conference champion; x – Division champion/co-champions; y – Championship game participant; ^ – NWCCC playoff participant

1979 Northwest Athletic Association of Community Colleges football standings
	Conf.					Overall
Team	W		L		T	W		L		T
Walla Walla $	6	–	0	–	0	8	–	1	–	0
Columbia Basin	4	–	2	–	0	7	–	2	–	0
Yakima Valley	4	–	2	–	0	6	–	2	–	0
Olympic	3	–	3	–	0	5	–	4	–	0
Spokane Falls	2	–	4	–	0	2	–	7	–	0
Wenatchee Valley	1	–	5	–	0	1	–	7	–	0
Treasure Valley	1	–	5	–	0	1	–	8	–	0
$ – Conference champion

1980 Northwest Athletic Association of Community Colleges football standings
	Conf.					Overall
Team	W		L		T	W		L		T
Olympic $	5	–	1	–	0	8	–	2	–	0
Spokane Falls	5	–	1	–	0	6	–	3	–	0
Walla Walla	4	–	2	–	0	7	–	2	–	0
Wenatchee Valley	3	–	3	–	0	5	–	4	–	0
Yakima Valley	3	–	3	–	0	4	–	6	–	0
Treasure Valley	1	–	5	–	0	1	–	8	–	0
Columbia Basin	0	–	6	–	0	1	–	8	–	0
$ – Conference champion

1981 Northwest Athletic Association of Community Colleges football standings
	Conf.					Overall
Team	W		L		T	W		L		T
Northern Division
Spokane Falls xy	4	–	1	–	2	5	–	3	–	2
Olympic	4	–	1	–	2	5	–	2	–	2
Wenatchee Valley	3	–	4	–	0	3	–	6	–	0
Southern Division
Walla Walla xy$	6	–	1	–	0	8	–	2	–	0
Yakima Valley	1	–	6	–	0	2	–	7	–	0
Columbia Basin	1	–	6	–	0	1	–	6	–	0
NWAACC championship game: Walla Walla 10, Spokane Falls 0
$ – Conference champion; x – Division champion/co-champions; y – Championship game participant

1982 Northwest Athletic Association of Community Colleges football standings
	Conf.					Overall
Team	W		L		T	W		L		T
Northern Division
Spokane Falls xy$	4	–	3	–	0	5	–	4	–	0
Olympic	3	–	3	–	0	4	–	4	–	0
Wenatchee Valley	2	–	4	–	0	3	–	5	–	0
Southern Division
Walla Walla xy	6	–	1	–	0	7	–	2	–	0
Yakima Valley	3	–	3	–	0	5	–	3	–	0
Columbia Basin	1	–	5	–	0	1	–	5	–	0
NWAACC championship game: Spokane Falls 23, Walla Walla 19
$ – Conference champion; x – Division champion/co-champions; y – Championship game participant

1983 Northwest Athletic Association of Community Colleges football standings
	Conf.					Overall
Team	W		L		T	W		L		T
Wenatchee Valley $	8	–	0	–	0	9	–	0	–	1
Walla Walla	6	–	2	–	0	8	–	2	–	0
Olympic	3	–	5	–	0	5	–	5	–	0
Yakima Valley	2	–	6	–	0	3	–	7	–	0
Spokane Falls	1	–	7	–	0	2	–	8	–	0
$ – Conference champion

1984 Northwest Athletic Association of Community Colleges football standings
	Conf.					Overall
Team	W		L		T	W		L		T
Spokane Falls $	7	–	1	–	0	8	–	2	–	0
Walla Walla	6	–	2	–	0	7	–	2	–	0
Wenatchee Valley	4	–	4	–	0	4	–	5	–	0
Olympic	3	–	5	–	0	3	–	7	–	0
Yakima Valley	0	–	8	–	0	0	–	9	–	0
$ – Conference champion

1985 Northwest Athletic Association of Community Colleges football standings
	Conf.					Overall
Team	W		L		T	W		L		T
Walla Walla +	6	–	2	–	0	8	–	2	–	0
Spokane Falls +	6	–	2	–	0	7	–	2	–	0
Wenatchee Valley	5	–	3	–	0	6	–	4	–	0
Yakima Valley	2	–	6	–	0	2	–	7	–	0
Olympic	1	–	7	–	0	2	–	7	–	0
+ – Conference co-champions

1986 Northwest Athletic Association of Community Colleges football standings
	Conf.					Overall
Team	W		L		T	W		L		T
Walla Walla $	8	–	0	–	0	9	–	0	–	0
Yakima Valley	5	–	3	–	0	5	–	5	–	0
Spokane Falls	4	–	4	–	0	4	–	4	–	0
Wenatchee Valley	3	–	5	–	0	3	–	5	–	0
Olympic	0	–	8	–	0	0	–	9	–	0
$ – Conference champion

1987 Northwest Athletic Association of Community Colleges football standings
	Conf.					Overall
Team	W		L		T	W		L		T
Walla Walla $	5	–	1	–	0	7	–	3	–	0
Wenatchee Valley	3	–	3	–	0	4	–	4	–	1
Yakima Valley	2	–	4	–	0	4	–	5	–	0
Spokane Falls	2	–	4	–	0	3	–	5	–	0
$ – Conference champion

1988 Northwest Athletic Association of Community Colleges football standings
	Conf.					Overall
Team	W		L		T	W		L		T
Walla Walla $	4	–	2	–	0	6	–	5	–	0
Spokane Falls	3	–	3	–	0	5	–	4	–	0
Wenatchee Valley	3	–	3	–	0	4	–	4	–	0
Yakima Valley	2	–	4	–	0	4	–	5	–	0
$ – Conference champion

1989 Northwest Athletic Association of Community Colleges football standings
	Conf.					Overall
Team	W		L		T	W		L		T
Walla Walla $	5	–	1	–	0	7	–	2	–	0
Wenatchee Valley	4	–	2	–	0	6	–	3	–	0
Spokane Falls	3	–	3	–	0	4	–	5	–	0
Yakima Valley	0	–	6	–	0	2	–	7	–	0
$ – Conference champion
