= Peninsula College =

Community college in Port Angeles, Washington, U.S.

Coordinates: 48°06′03″N 123°24′46″W

Peninsula College is a public community college in Port Angeles, Washington, on the Olympic Peninsula. It is part of the Washington Community and Technical Colleges system and offers Bachelor of Applied Science in Management and Behavioral Healthcare degrees, transfer Associate degree programs, professional-technical degrees and certificates, community education courses, and pre-college courses. It also has distance education and online learning options.

Peninsula College's service district encompasses Clallam and Jefferson Counties and extends from the Pacific Ocean at Neah Bay to Brinnon on Hood Canal.

== History ==
A group of local citizens who wanted to be able to continue their education without having to travel to college centers in Bremerton or across Puget Sound founded the college in 1961, with the first classes being held in a small building on the Port Angeles High School campus. The number of students who enrolled in the college grew larger than the available facilities could accommodate, and construction of a permanent campus began in 1964. The next year, the first classes were held on the present site of Peninsula College in Southeast Port Angeles, with additional classes offered across the service district. Today, the main campus covers 75 acres (30.4 ha) of land and houses 15 buildings, including the first Longhouse built on a community college campus in the United States.

== Facilities ==
=== Port Angeles Campus ===
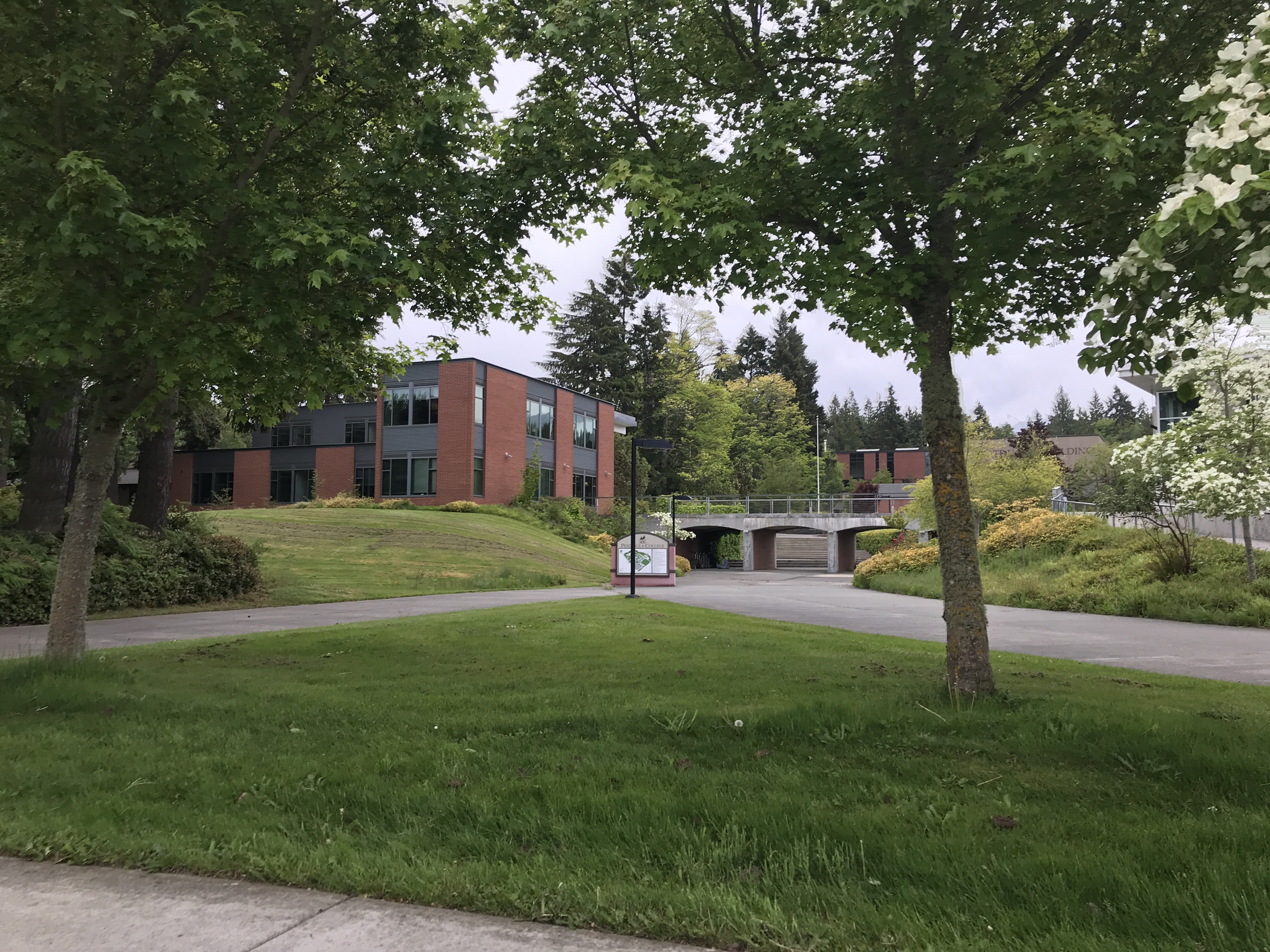

The main Port Angeles campus has computer labs, lecture halls, a student childcare center, gymnasium, fitness center, soccer field, and student union building, known as the Pirate Union Building or PUB. The PUB houses a theater, art gallery, food services, a bookstore, lounge area, and student government offices. Since 2001, more than three-quarters of the college's original structures have been remodeled or replaced. These include Maier Hall, completed in 2011; a Library/Media Center, completed in 2008; Keegan Hall, completed in 2007; and a Longhouse, completed in 2007.

Maier Hall is the largest building on campus, at 62,950 square feet (5,850 m^{2}). The facility includes classrooms, a Basic Skills Center, faculty offices, and a learning lab area that includes computer, math, English, and foreign language labs.

The 56,000-square-foot (5,200 m^{2}) Keegan Hall Science and Technology Building contains a lecture hall, 13 labs, five classrooms, faculty offices, and two conference rooms in two separate wings—a Science Wing and a Technology Wing.

The newest building on campus, the 41,650-square-foot (3,870 m^{2}) Allied Health and Early Childhood Development Center, opened in March 2017. Along with teaching labs and spaces for health and early childhood education programs, this building also houses the on-campus childcare center.

The Peninsula College Longhouse (ʔaʔk̓ʷustəƞáwt̓xʷ) was the first longhouse in the nation built on a community college campus. A collaboration between the college and six local tribes: Hoh, Quileute, Makah, Port Gamble S'Klallam, Jamestown S'Klallam, and Lower Elwha Klallam, the Longhouse serves as a cultural center on campus, hosting frequent campus, community and tribal events.

The 26,680-square-foot (2,480 m^{2}) library is a central teaching-learning resource with a smart classroom, individual and group study areas, conference rooms, print and nonprint collections, and research workstations. Its focus is on supporting the curriculum of Peninsula College alongside collecting and supporting the works of scholars associated with the college and the area.

=== Forks Campus ===
The Forks campus is located in Forks, Washington, 57 miles (92 km) west of Port Angeles. The site includes classrooms, conference rooms and study areas, and serves the West End of the Olympic Peninsula.

=== East Jefferson County locations ===
Peninsula College has two locations in East Jefferson County—the main campus located in historic Fort Worden in Port Townsend, and a second site, the Jefferson Education Center, located in Port Hadlock. Basic Skills, English as a Second Language, GED classes, community education classes, and Professional Development and Business Training are offered. The Fort Worden location, recently renovated, received an honorable mention award at the AIA Washington Council Civic Design Awards Ceremony in 2017 based on its preservation of historic aspects while creating a modern learning environment.

== Academics ==
Peninsula College offers Bachelor of Applied Science (BAS) degrees in Management and Behavioral Health. These four-year degrees enable applicants with AAS, AAS-T, AA, and AS degrees to combine their lower-division technical or transfer preparation with upper-division credits in behavioral health or management, including specialized coursework in entrepreneurship and marketing, tribal management, IT management, and human resources management. The college also awards three associate degrees designed for transfer to baccalaureate institutions awarding the Bachelor of Arts or Bachelor of Science degrees: Associate in Arts, Associate in Science, and Associate in Business Education. The Associate of Arts degree is one of the highest enrolled programs at Peninsula College. Additionally, the college awards the Associate in Applied Science and Associate in Applied Science–Transfer degrees in addition to professional and technical education programs.

== Student demographics 2021-2022 ==
As an open-access institution, Peninsula College admits all persons, provided they are eighteen years of age or older; or are a high school graduate or equivalent; or have applied for admission under the provisions of a student enrollment options program such as Running Start, a successor program, or other local enrollment options program.

During the 2021–2022 academic year, Peninsula College students had the following student profile:

- FTE Student Count: 1495
- Female: 62%
- Male: 31%
- Not exclusively male or female: 1%
- Median Age: 25
- Students of color (of those reporting): 35%
- Students who work while attending classes: 21%
- Students with children (of those reporting): 27%

== Athletics ==
Peninsula College competes in the Northwest Athletic Conference (NWAC) as the Pirates, fielding men's and women's teams for soccer and basketball. The teams have received the following conference championship titles:

=== NWAC Championships ===
1970 MBB, 2010 MSOC, 2011 MBB, 2012 MSOC, 2012 WSOC, 2013 MSOC, 2013 WSOC, 2015 MSOC, 2015 WBB, 2016 WSOC, 2018 WSOC, 2019 MSOC, 2021 WSOC, 2023 MSOC

=== Division Championships ===
- Women's soccer: 2011, 2012, 2013, 2014, 2015, 2016, 2017, 2018, 2019, spring 2021, fall 2021, 2022, 2023
- Men's soccer: 2007, 2009, 2010, 2011, 2012, 2013, 2014, 2015, 2016, 2019, spring 2021, fall 2021, 2022, 2023
- Women's basketball: 2018–19, 2021–22, 2022–23
- Men's basketball: 2022–23

== Accreditation ==
Peninsula College is accredited by the Northwest Commission on Colleges and Universities (NWCCU) to award associate and applied baccalaureate degrees. Its next evaluation will be in Spring 2018. Peninsula College is approved by the Veterans Administration for attendance by veterans under Public Laws 550 and 894.

== Notable alumni ==
- Ben Johnson, former chairman of the Makah Tribal Council (1998–2000, 2001–2007)
