= Grays Harbor College =

Community college in Aberdeen, Washington, US

Coordinates: 46°57′12″N 123°48′10″W

- Type: Public community college
- Established: 1930
- Location: Aberdeen, Washington, United States
- Website: www.ghc.edu

Grays Harbor College is a public community college in Aberdeen, Washington, United States. Established in 1930, the college sits on a 120-acre (0.49 km^{2}) campus overlooking the town of Aberdeen and its seaport on the edge of the Pacific Ocean. Additional "learning centers" are located in Raymond, Ilwaco, North Aberdeen, and Southside Aberdeen.

== Athletics ==
Grays Harbor College competes in the Northwest Athletic Conference (NWAC) as the Chokers, fielding men's teams for baseball and wrestling; women's teams for soccer, softball, and volleyball; and men's and women's teams for basketball and golf.

== Notable alumni ==
- Brian Blake – American logger, forester and politician from Washington
- Brian Hatfield – American politician from Washington
- John Madden – American football coach and announcer (1936–2021)
- Allan Mustard – American diplomat
- Robert Rozier – US murderer and gridiron-football player (born 1955)
