= Everett Community College =

Public college in Everett, Washington, US

Coordinates: 48°00′21″N 122°12′10″W

- Other name: EvCC
- Type: Public community college
- Established: 1941
- Accreditation: NWCCU
- President: Chemene Crawford
- Faculty: 111 full-time, 214 part-time
- Students: 11,986 in 2023–24
- Location: Everett, Washington, U.S.
- Campus: Suburban
- Colors: Red
- Mascot: Trojans
- Website: www.everettcc.edu

Everett Community College (EvCC) is a public community college in Everett, Washington. EvCC educates more than 19,000 students every year at locations throughout Snohomish County, Washington, with most students and faculty at the main campus in Everett.

== History ==
Everett Junior College (EJC) was founded in 1941, with the college's first students taking classes at a converted elementary school. In 1957, construction began on a new college campus in north Everett. The campus, which originally included seven buildings, opened in 1958.

The college's name changed to Everett Community College in 1967 to conform with the Washington State Community College Act.

On February 16, 1987, an arson fire broke out at the college's library that destroyed the main student services building and killed firefighter Gary Parks. The arson destroyed 48,000 books and remained unsolved for decades. In 2021, Elmer Nash pleaded guilty to the first-degree murder of Parks; he had been 12 years old at the time of the arson and admitted to starting it to conceal a theft. A new library and service building was opened in October 1988 at the same site and dedicated to Parks, who was honored with a statue in the courtyard. The building cost $8 million to construct and stock with new books, using funds from the state legislature and private donations.

== Campus ==
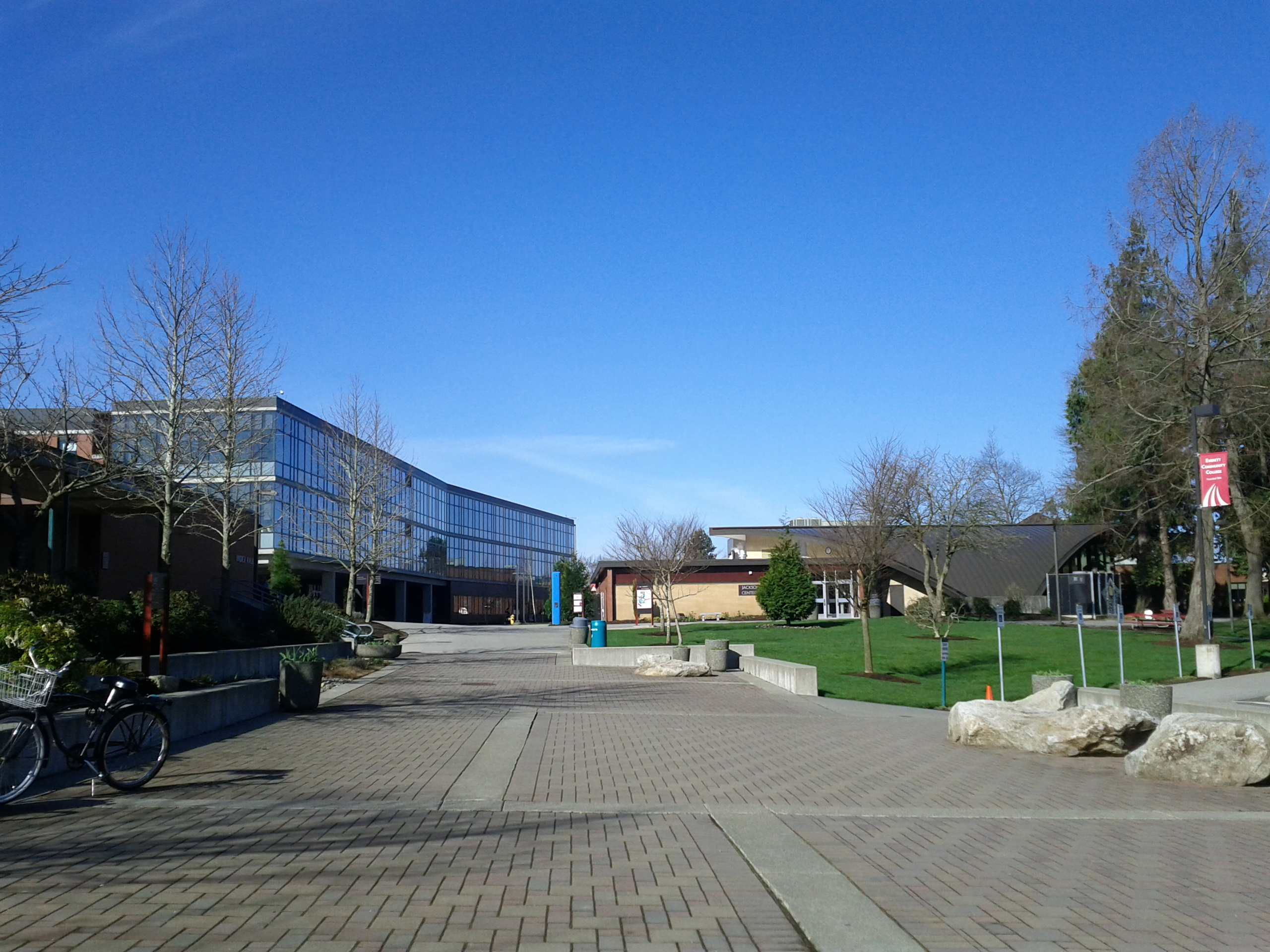
Gray Wolf Hall and the Henry M. Jackson Conference Center on the EVCC campus in North Everett

Everett Community College's north Everett campus is located at 2000 Tower St. in Everett on 46 acres near the Legion Memorial Park Golf Course. The campus includes 20 buildings, many of them named after the peaks of the Cascade and Olympic mountain ranges.

The Nippon Business Institute at EvCC was founded in 1987 to provide education in Japanese language and culture, in part due to Everett's relationships with Japanese partners. The school's building is located at the southwest end of the campus and includes Nishiyama Garden, a traditional Japanese garden with Sukiya-zukuri wooden gates, gravel paths, and a portion of the Kintai Bridge from Iwakuni, Japan, one of Everett's sister cities.

Between 2007 and 2017, EvCC completed more than $150 million of new construction:

- 2007: Whitehorse Hall opens. The 88,000-square-foot (8,200 m^{2}) building is home to the college's physical sciences, visual arts, and journalism programs.
- 2009: Gray Wolf Hall opens. The 77,000-square-foot building has EvCC's humanities, social sciences, and communications programs.
- 2011: Walt Price Student Fitness Center opens. The 49,000-square-foot (4,600 m^{2}) building replaced the college's 1958 gym. In 2015, EvCC named the building in honor of former athletic director and coach Walt Price.
- 2013: Liberty Hall opens. The three-story, 72,000-square-foot building is located on north Broadway next to the college's fitness center. It is home to the college's nursing, medical assisting and phlebotomy programs and other health sciences training, plus EvCC's criminal justice, fire science, and EMT programs.
- 2014: Advanced Manufacturing Training & Education Center (AMTEC) opens, being the first campus building located on the east side of Broadway. AMTEC educates students in six programs - mechatronics, precision machining, welding and fabrication, engineering technician, composites and pre-employment. The center teaches students about the manufacturing process from start to finish as they complete interdisciplinary projects like creating unmanned aerial vehicles, rockets, robots and paddle boards. AMTEC expanded in 2015, adding 17,000 square feet to make the center 54,000 square feet.
- 2016: Mountain View Hall opens. The college's first student housing building has 120 furnished private rooms with their own bathrooms and shared kitchen space. All units in both buildings are fully furnished. Rent includes all utilities and wireless internet. Mountain View was constructed by Snohomish-based real estate developer Koz Development, Inc.
- 2017: Cedar Hall opens. The college's second student housing building includes 132 beds in furnished studio, three bedroom, and four-bedroom apartments with living rooms and kitchens. Rent includes all utilities and wireless internet.

In September 2023, the Cascade Learning Resource Center opened after being announced in 2018 and beginning construction in 2021. The center included the new locations for the campus library, relocated from the basement of the Parks Student Union building,; the tutoring center, the writing center, an art gallery named after EvCC art teacher Russel Day, and a new center focused on transformative teaching.e-learning. The center was named after Cascade Hall, the campus' original student union building.

In addition to the college's main campus in north Everett, EvCC offers classes at their Aviation Maintenance Technical School at Paine Field, and School of Cosmetology in Marysville.

== Organization and administration ==
EvCC is one of 34 community and technical colleges governed by the Washington State Board of Community and Technical Colleges. The college is administered by a five-member board of trustees appointed by Washington state's governor. EvCC's president is Chemene Crawford. The college is accredited by the Northwest Commission on Colleges and Universities.

== Academics ==
In 2016-17 the college educated 19,673 students. EvCC students range in age from 12 to 85 with the largest number of students between 18 and 21 years of age.

Students come to EvCC to start their four-year degrees, earn certificates, train for new jobs, experience hands-on training in professional and technical programs, learn English, develop basic skills, finish high school, train for a promotion, or to learn just for fun.

The college offers more than 90 different majors and programs. Associate degrees are available in Arts and Sciences, Science, Business, Applied Science, Technical Arts, Fine Arts, and General Studies. Certificates of completion are awarded in more than 30 technical and career fields. Students can also enroll in Transitional Studies classes to improve their basic skills, upgrade job skills, prepare for college-level classes, learn to speak English, complete high school, and earn a GED.

EvCC also offers professional development and career training options through its Corporate & Continuing Education Center. Courses can be customized and delivered on-site throughout Snohomish County and the Northwest.

In addition to traditional classroom courses, EvCC offers online courses.

== Athletics ==
Everett Community College has 11 athletic teams including baseball, softball, basketball, soccer, cross country, track and field, and volleyball. All teams use the school colors of red and white. The college's mascot, the Trojan, was selected by students in 1941. Everett Community College teams compete in the Northwest Athletic Conference (NWAC).

== Notable people ==
=== Alumni ===
- Rick Anderson, professional baseball player
- Earl Averill Jr.
- Jean Berkey, politician
- Stan Boreson, the "King of Scandinavian Humor"
- Chuck Close, photographer and painter
- Aaron Cunningham, professional baseball player
- Stephen Fife, professional baseball player
- Steve Hobbs, politician
- Keone Kela, professional baseball player
- John Koster, politician
- Lloyd Meeds, politician
- Mason Tobin, professional baseball player
- Archie Van Winkle, United States Marine and Medal of Honor recipient (Korean War)

=== Faculty ===
- Dick King, former Democratic Party politician

=== Staff ===
- Bob Gambold, football player and coach (former EvCC assistant football coach)
