= Columbia Basin College =

Community college in Pasco, Washington, US

- Type: Public community college
- Established: 1955
- Accreditation: NWCCU
- President: Rebekah Woods
- Students: 11,243
- Location: Pasco, Washington, United States; 46°15′09″N 119°07′19″W
- Campus: Rural
- Colors: Hawk Blue and Soaring Blue
- Sporting affiliations: NWAC
- Mascot: Hawk
- Website: columbiabasin.edu
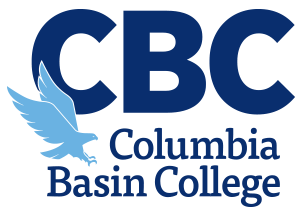

Columbia Basin College (CBC) is a public community college in Pasco, Washington. It is accredited by the Northwest Commission on Colleges and Universities. The college offers English as a second language and General Educational Development (GED) prep classes, the Running Start program, many associate degree (transfer, associate of applied science, associate of arts) programs, and the Bachelor of Applied Science degree.

== History ==
Columbia Basin College has served Benton and Franklin counties for nearly 60 years. The first classes at CBC were authorized by the State Board of Education in May 1955. Classes began in September, 1955 in temporary quarters at the former Pasco Naval Airbase. The Pasco School District received title to more than 150 acres (0.61 km^{2}) of land for the present campus site in Pasco. CBC's first permanent building was completed in 1957 and was the V building which was replaced in 2011 by the Center for Career and Technical Education (CTE). The Community College Act of 1967 separated the college from the Pasco School District and CBC became the 19th community college district in the state of Washington. CBC continually expands and renovates programs which now includes Bachelor of Applied Science degrees. The enrollment of the college has grown from 299 students in 1955 to more than 8,000 students per quarter today. The faculty includes 140 full-time instructors and 300 part-time instructors.

== Campus ==
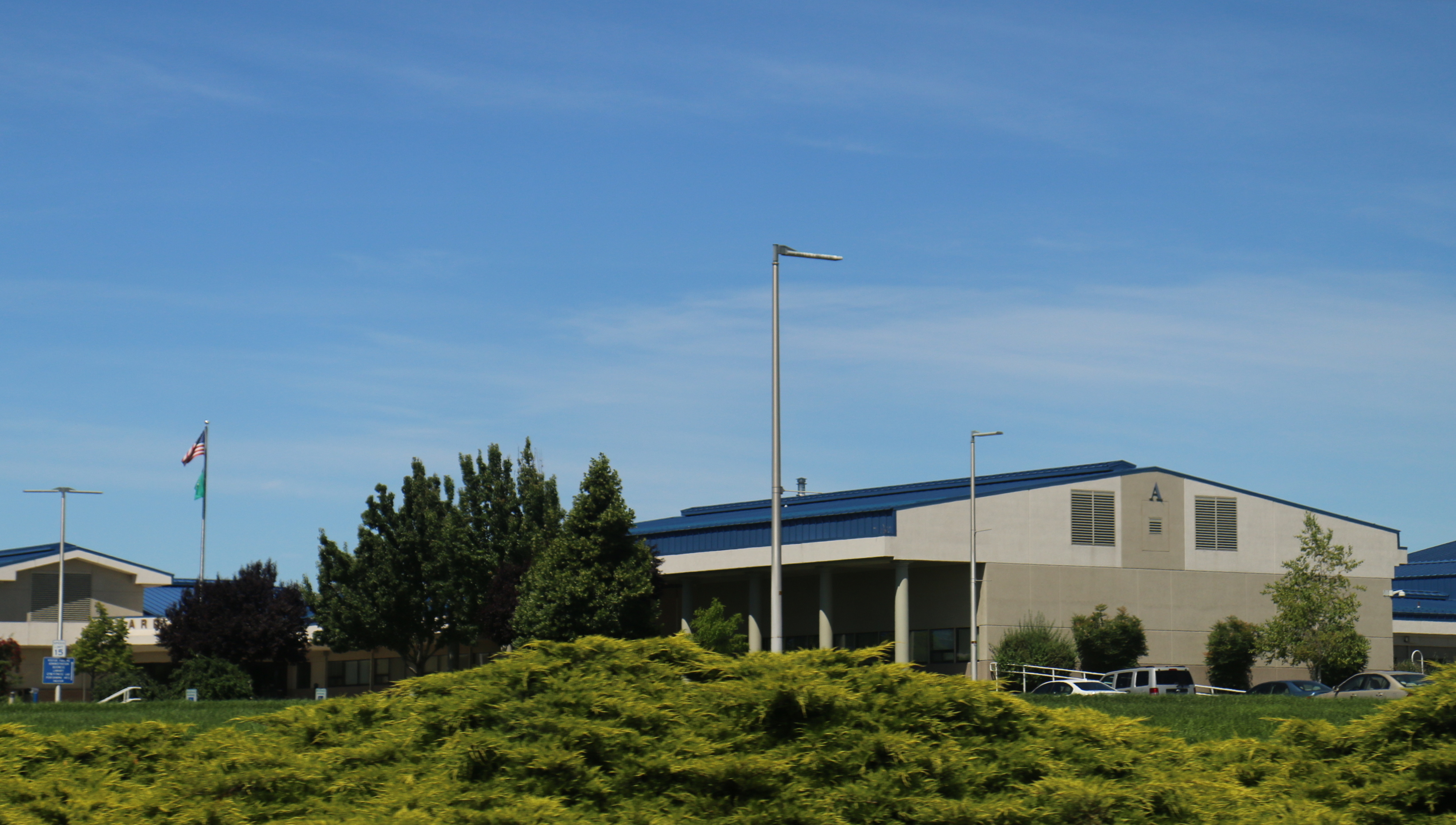
Buildings on the Columbia Basin College campus

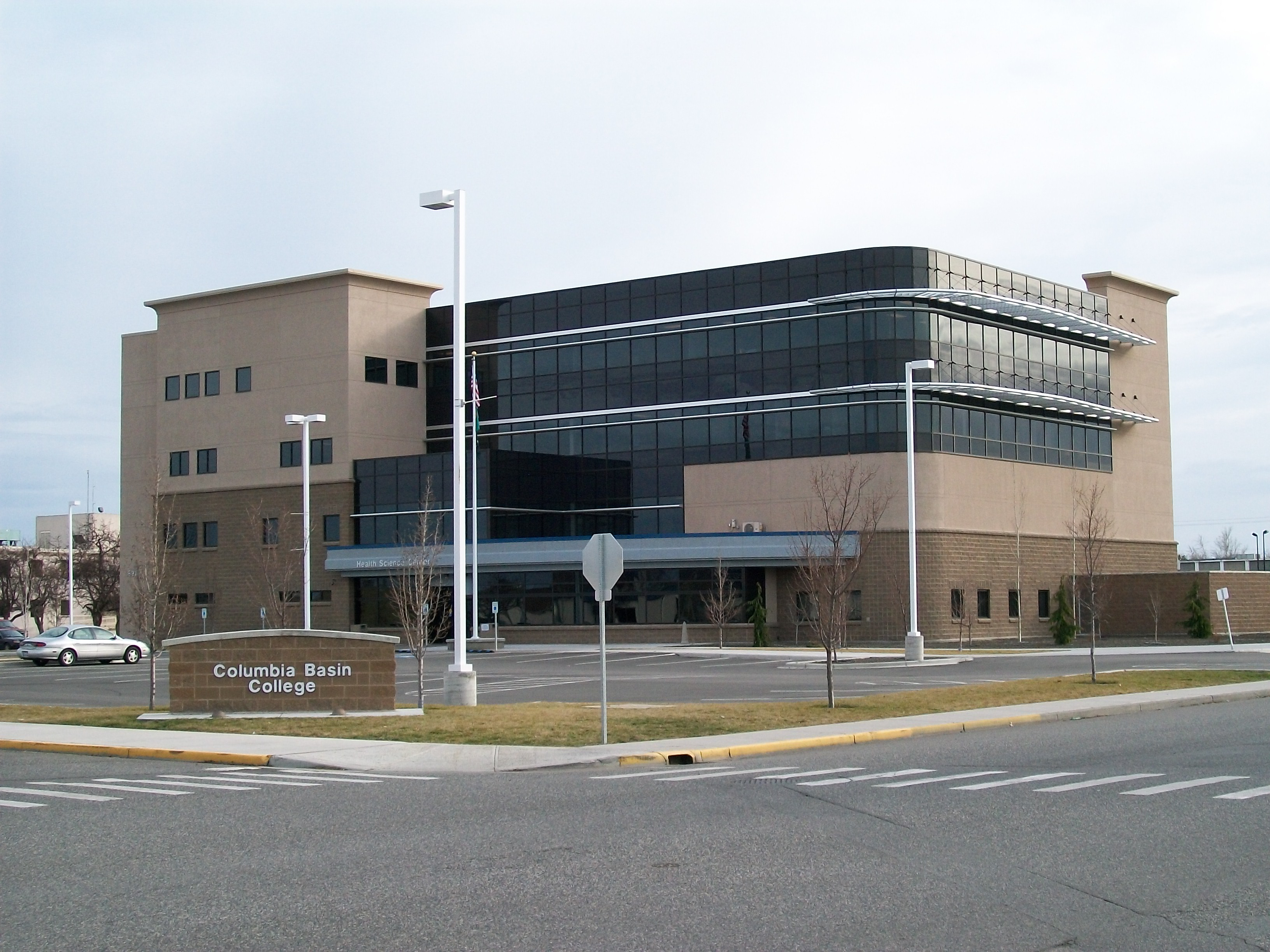
Health Science Center

The Pasco campus has seen substantial growth in the past decade, adding new facilities to accommodate the large demand for higher education from a growing community. Standout facilities include the Arts Center (P building), Lee R. Thornton Center for Science, Technology, and Diversity; CPCCo Planetarium; Robert & Elisabeth Moore Observatory; the Center for Career and Technical Education (CTE); and a research farm. Recent infrastructure improvements include substantial remodels to the Hawk Union Building (HUB), Business building, the Library, the Science building, the Administration building, the Student Recreation Center, the athletic fields, and the I-Complex.

The CBC Health Science Center is located in Richland, Washington, approximately 10 miles from the main campus. The four-story building was built in 2006 to house CBC's Health Sciences programs. The Wortman Medical Science Building on the Richland Campus and a new Social Sciences and World Language building opened on the Pasco campus in 2017.

== Athletics ==
CBC is a member of the Northwest Athletic Conference (NWAC) and the mascot is the Hawk. CBC sports include:

- Volleyball
- Baseball
- Softball
- Men's and Women's Soccer
- Men's and Women's Basketball
- Men's and Women's Golf

== Student life ==
Activities and events that are hosted by CBC, the Associated Students of CBC, and various student clubs. The Theatre Arts Department produces multiple stage productions each year, the Music Department has multiple concerts each quarter, and the CBC Esvelt Gallery hosts multiple student and guest artist exhibits year-round.

== Notable alumni ==
- Byron Beck, professional basketball player
- Steve Buratto, professional football coach
- Darrell Ceciliani, professional baseball player
- Clint Didier, professional football player
- Ron East, professional football player
- Doc Hastings, former member of the U.S. House of Representatives
- Mark Kafentzis, professional football player
- Karen LaVoie, actress
- Dave McKay, professional baseball player
- Travis Nelson (politician), member of the Oregon House of Representatives
- Chad Orvella, professional baseball player
- Leon Rice, college basketball coach
- Nikki Torres, member of the Washington State Senate
- Ray Washburn, professional baseball player
