= Walla Walla Community College =

College in southeastern Washington State, U.S.

Coordinates: 46°04′42″N 118°16′36″W

- Type: Public community college
- Established: 1967; 59 years ago
- Accreditation: Northwest Commission on Colleges and Universities (NWCCU)
- President: Chad Emerson Hickox
- Students: 2,662 (all undergraduate) (Fall 2022)
- Location: Walla Walla, Washington, United States of America
- Campus: Three campuses in Washington
- Colors: Black and Gold
- Nickname: The Warriors
- Sporting affiliations: Northwest Intercollegiate Athletic Association (NWAC)
- Website: www.wwcc.edu

Walla Walla Community College (WWCC), often referred to as just "CC" locally, is a multi-campus community college in southeastern Washington state.

== History ==
Walla Walla Community College (WWCC) was established in 1967 by Peter Dietrich in response to the region's growing need for a community college. Initially located in the educational complex on Park St., formerly occupied by Walla Walla High School, WWCC later relocated to its current site east of town near the airport, after outgrowing its original location. Additionally, a branch campus was established in Clarkston, WA, 100 miles to the east.

In the late 1990s, WWCC introduced one of its most significant programs, the enological and viticulture program, amid economic uncertainty in Walla Walla caused by the local decline in the agriculture industry. This program played a crucial role in the subsequent expansion of the wine industry in Walla Walla by producing many of the region's winemakers. Over time, WWCC has developed a variety of non-traditional programs, including the Commercial Truck Driver Program, John Deere Technology Program, and Water Technologies and Management Program, to address the evolving needs of the Walla Walla Valley.

Most recently, WWCC has undertaken the expansion of the Southeast Area Tech Skills Center (SEA Tech Center), involving the construction of a multimillion-dollar building at the main campus to accommodate new programs in collaboration with area high schools.

In recognition of its excellence, Walla Walla Community College was honored with the Aspen Prize for Community College Excellence in 2013.

== Campus ==
The college is spread over three campuses in southeastern Washington state. The WWCC also maintains a facility at the Washington State Penitentiary.

== Academics ==
The college has an average annual enrollment of about 9,000 students. It has numerous areas of study and certificates, as well as 45 different associate degree programs.

== Athletics ==
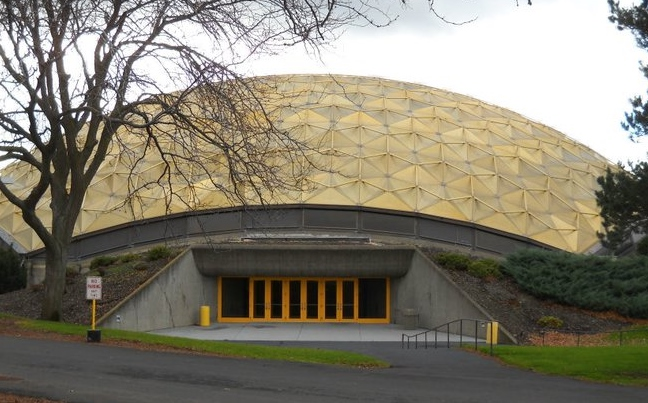
Dietrich Center, often called "The Dome"

WWCC fields teams (stylized as the Walla Walla Warriors) in eleven sports. In the Fall, Warrior Field plays host to men's and women's soccer, while volleyball takes center stage in the Dietrich Center – often referred to as 'The Dome'. The winter quarter sees The Dome taken over by the men's and women's basketball, while the spring months offer baseball, softball, men's and women's golf, and rodeo. The Warriors play in the Northwest Intercollegiate Athletic Association (NWAC)

== Notable people ==
- Mark Klicker, businessman and politician
- Tommy Lloyd, head men's basketball coach at University of Arizona, former assistant basketball coach at Gonzaga
- Chuck Martin, college basketball coach
- Kimo von Oelhoffen, NFL defensive tackle
- Ricky Pierce, professional basketball player
- Bryan Pittman, NFL long snapper
- Mike Sellers, NFL fullback for the Washington Football Team
