= Olympic College =

Community college in Bremerton, Washington, USA

Coordinates: 47°34′36″N 122°38′10″W

- Type: Public community college
- Established: 1946
- President: Chantae Recasner
- Students: 12,825
- Location: Bremerton, Washington, United States
- Colors: Red and White
- Nickname: OC
- Mascot: Rangers | Gifford
- Website: www.olympic.edu

Olympic College is a public community college in Bremerton, Washington, United States. It opened as Olympic Junior College in 1946. Olympic College serves Kitsap and Mason counties in Washington. The college's service area contains two major naval installations, Naval Base Kitsap and Naval Hospital Bremerton.

== History ==
For their inaugural season in 2012, the Kitsap Admirals used the Bremer Student Center as their home venue. The team has since relocated to more suburban Silverdale at Olympic High School.

In 2015, Olympic College was named as one of ten finalists for the Aspen Prize for Community College Excellence, the nation's preeminent recognition of high achievement and performance in America's community colleges.

== Academics ==
The college offers certificates, associate degrees, and bachelor's degrees. Through partnerships with local universities like Washington State University and Western Washington University, students can also complete an associate degree with Olympic College then transfer into a partner program to earn a bachelor's degree without having to leave Kitsap County.

== Campus ==
The college's main campus is a 33-acre (13 ha) site located in Bremerton, Washington, and its two satellite campuses are located in Poulsbo and Shelton, Washington. The Poulsbo campus is a 20-acre (8.1 ha) site and is 15.9 miles (25.6 km) from the main campus, while the 27-acre (11 ha) Shelton campus is located 38.4 miles (61.8 km) from the main campus. These three campuses serve more than 12,000 students a year mainly from the 281,374 residents of Kitsap and Mason counties spread over 1,617 square miles (4,190 km^{2}) of wooded and lowland mountain terrain (Census 2000).

The land for both the Shelton and Poulsbo campuses was donated. The 27 acres of land that is now the Shelton campus was donated by Simpson Timber in 1991 and the 20 acres of land that is now the Poulsbo campus was donated by the Olhava Family in 1993.

== Enrollment ==
The student body is predominantly full-time (59%), between the ages of 20–29 (37.7%), and slightly more female than male (56% female). At 73% white, the student body is more diverse than the two counties in which its campuses are located (Kitsap 84% white, Mason 89%), and is more like Seattle (70% white) in King County, which is an hour's ferry ride from Bremerton across the waters of Puget Sound.
