= Running Start =

U.S. college credit program for high school students

Running Start is a dual credit enrollment program in Washington, Hawaii, New Hampshire, Montana and Illinois which allows high school juniors and seniors to attend college courses numbered 100 or above, while completing high school. It is similar to other dual enrollment programs common at public and private colleges and universities in other states like Concurrent Enrollment or Dual Enrollment. Running Start credits are held in equally high regard as Advanced Placement or International Baccalaureate.

== History ==
Washington State implemented their Running Start program in 1993. Following Washington State was New Hampshire in 1999, Montana in 2001, Hawaii in 2007, and Illinois in 2012. Running Start and Dual Enrollment Programs across the United States have seen a huge increase in enrollment. Washington State has seen a 56 percent increase in enrollment in the past ten years and had over 26,000 students enrolled in the 2016–2017 school year. Across the United States there are an estimated 2 million high school students enrolled in a dual enrollment program.

== Washington State ==
The Running Start program in state was piloted in the early 1990s and officially approved to begin in the fall of 1993.

Running Start provides up to two years of paid tuition at any of Washington's community and technical colleges, and at Central Washington University, Eastern Washington University, Washington State University, and Northwest Indian College. High school juniors who can pass the entrance exam for a local community college may take part or all of their coursework at the community college. Successfully passing a course earns a student both high school and college credit.

Running Start students can complete a substantial number of their first two years of college credits early. After high school, they pay for fewer community college credits before moving on to four-year institutions; it is possible for a motivated student to earn both a high school diploma and certain two-year college associate's degrees simultaneously.

New state regulations took effect on July 26, 2011, limiting Running Start students to a 1.0 FTE (full-time equivalent) limit for high school or higher education courses each, and a 1.2 FTE limit for both institutions combined. (1.0 FTE is equivalent to 15 college credits, or 1,500 high school weekly minutes of instruction). Students who wish to take more than 15 college credits may pay the regular tuition rate and still receive dual credit. Fee waiver for additional credits might be available if the student belongs to low-income family (e.g., enrolled in free or reduced lunch program in high school).

While tuition is paid for by the student's current school district, students have to pay fees, purchase textbooks, and provide transportation for themselves.

== University of Hawaiʻi ==
Open to most high school juniors and seniors, Running Start allows students to receive credit with their public high school as well as receive college credit from the University of Hawaiʻi. Unlike Washington, tuition is sometimes charged, with costs varying from school to school. GEAR UP Hawaii currently offers a limited number of scholarships who currently receive free or reduced lunch. In order to participate in Running Start, students must first receive parental consent, complete an online application, have up-to-date vaccinations, take a placement test, and complete a TB test.

== Criticism ==
Statistics from 2016–2017 have shown that Running Start is not as effective as Advanced Placement in reaching low-income families. Fewer than 5 percent of Running Start students were from low-income families, compared with 13 percent of Advanced Placement classes. Demographically speaking, the Running Start program has been credited as having made a notable impact, as a study done in Texas revealed that 5 percent of African-American students credit stemmed from concurrent enrollment and white students credit was double that as of 2016. Since the popularity of dual enrollment programs such as Running Start, college professors are noting a decrease of middle-class American students in their classrooms. Concurrent enrollment is similar to dual enrollment in that the student will receive college and high school credit but concurrent enrollment involves staying at a high school campus and is significantly cheaper. Both programs are capable of reducing a mass amount of money that would otherwise go into years spent at university, although concurrent enrollment eliminates certain fees that a student would have to pay in Running Start.
