= Wenatchee Valley College =

Community college in Wenatchee, Washington, U.S.

Coordinates: 47°25′53″N 120°20′10″W

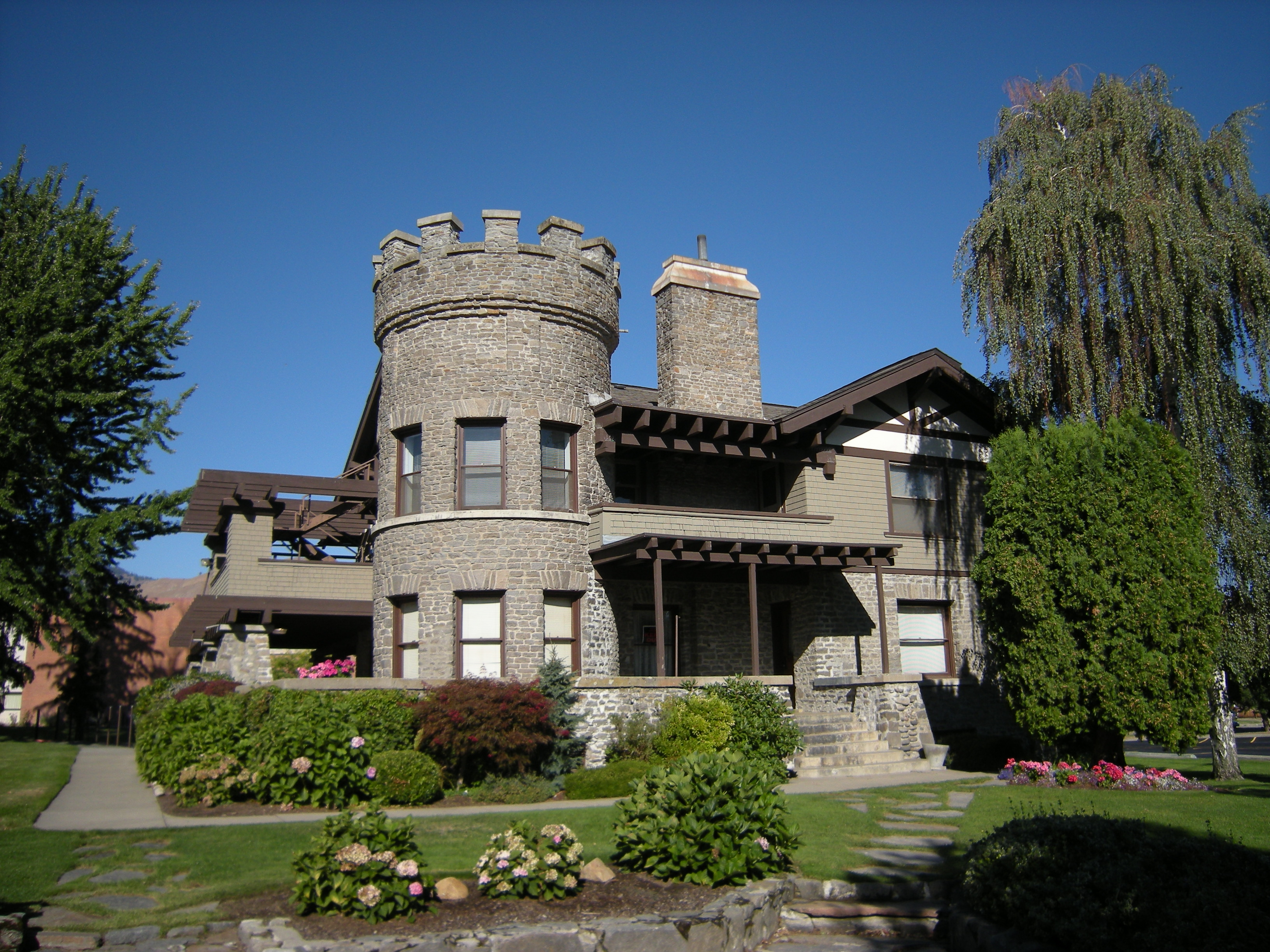
- Type: Public college
- Established: 1939
- Affiliations: NWAACC
- President: Faimous Harrison
- Students: 5,800
- Location: Wenatchee, Washington, United States
- Campus: Rural
- Colors: Black and White
- Mascot: Knights
- Website: wvc.edu

Wenatchee Valley College (WVC) is a public college in Wenatchee, Washington, United States. The college provides students with adult education classes, certifications, associate degrees, and four bachelor's degrees.

The school consists of two campuses, a main campus in central Wenatchee and an Omak campus. Because of the close proximity to area high schools, WVC maintains a sizable Running Start student population, with students attending college during the junior and senior years in high school.

== History ==
Wenatchee Valley College originally opened as a private college in 1939, supported by donations from 51 area residents. In 1941, Wenatchee Valley College was adopted into the state public education system. Originally, classes were held on the third floor of the original Wenatchee High School situated at King and Idaho streets.

In 1949, the college moved to the home of A. Z. Wells on five acres (2 ha) of land along Fifth Street. The home was hand-built, consisting of stones from the Columbia River, and was modeled with castle style turrets. Wells House held all classrooms and offices, until additional buildings could be constructed allowing the Wells House to become a dormitory.

WVC was able to purchase land from neighboring land owners, expanding the campus to its current 56 acres (23 ha). Wells House still stands on the WVC Main Campus, although the building is owned by the Wells House Committee, and the Wenatchee Valley Museum currently maintains the mansion.

Community College District #15 was formed in 1967, expanding WVC's service area to include Chelan, Douglas, and Okanogan counties. A satellite campus was set up in Omak in a former hospital building, until the Omak campus was built in the mid-1970s near downtown Omak.

A large section of the WVC Main Campus in Wenatchee expanded in the late 2000s and early-mid 2010s. The college added parking to accommodate additional students. A new Central Washington University extension building was constructed west of Batjer Hall and north of Sexton Hall. Anderson Hall was demolished to make way for the new 82,000-square-foot (7,600 m^{2}) Wenatchi Hall, which opened in September 2007. Wenatchi Hall provides expanded room for Allied Health and Safety programs, science, math and other courses. The Wenatchee Valley Foundation raised funds to help finance the construction of the Music and Art Center, which opened near the Wells House in the fall of 2012. The MAC houses "The Grove" recital hall and the MAC Gallery as well as rehearsal halls, computerized music classrooms, recording studios, a sculpture studio, and four 2-story art studios with window walls facing north. In the spring of 2015, students voted to assess themselves a fee to build a new rec center which is expected to be completed during the summer of 2017. In 2019, Wenatchee Valley College is going to tear down parts of Wells Hall and renovate the building.

== Accreditation ==
Wenatchee Valley College is accredited by the Northwest Commission on Colleges and Universities. The Nursing Program and other Clinical programs are accredited through either the National League for Nursing or the National Accrediting Agency for Clinical Sciences.

== Campuses ==
The college has two campuses. The main campus is in Wenatchee. There is an additional campus in Omak.

== Athletics ==
Wenatchee Valley College competes in the Northwest Athletic Conference (NWAC) as the Knights, fielding men's teams for baseball, women's teams for softball and volleyball, and men's and women's teams for basketball and soccer.

== See also ==
- Wenatchee School District
