= Anastasia Halaby =

Palestinian artist and activist (1909–1998)

Anastasia "Asia" Halaby
- Born: 1909; Jerusalem, Palestine
- Died: 12 February 1998 (aged 88–89)
- Relatives: Sophie Halaby, Sister

Anastasia "Asia" Halaby (1909-12 February 1998) was a Palestinian embroiderer, intelligence officer and translator, archaeologist and activist. She was the sister of artist Sophie Halaby and the youngest of three children. During the occupation of Palestine during the Six-Day War, Halaby began working to influence the life's of hundreds of women and preserved Palestinian embroidery. Her work is credited with saving and contributing to the lives of Palestinians following the establishment of the State of Israel. In the end, Asia would become the politically active sister, while her sister, Sophie, the artist.

== Early years ==
Asia Halaby was born to a Palestinian-Christian father, Jiryes (George) Nicola Halaby, and a Russian-Russian Orthodox mother, Olga Akimovna Khudobasheva. Her parents met when her father was studying in Russia at the Kyiv Theological Academy, and moved back between Jerusalem and Kyiv until settling permanently in Jerusalem in 1917. As a child, Halaby was raised in Kiev, but following the Black Sea Raids in 1914 by the Ottoman Empire and the German Navy's on the Russian ports, with the onset of World War I, the family fled as they feared Olga would be subject to persecution. Upon returning to Palestine, the family settled and lived in Musrara, a well-off neighborhood in Jerusalem's New City. Halaby's family was one of high education: her father was a dragoman to the Russian Church, and her mother was a teacher. Halaby had two siblings, and in later life would live and work closely with her sister Sophie who was a well-known female-Palestinian artist who indirectly paved the way for future artists and resistance against Israeli occupation.

== Education ==
Halaby attended the English Girls' High School, (later known as the Jerusalem Girls' College). The family, being of an educated background, valued education and followed much of the population of Jerusalem in sending their daughters to the school to become fluent in English, gain access to higher education, and prepare for a globalizing world.

She graduated in 1926.

== World War II and post-war world ==
During World War II Asia began working with the British government, which would end in 1948. She was a member of the Auxiliary Territorial Services women's branch of the British Army, focusing in intelligence work outside of Cairo. Being fluent in several regional and European languages, Arabic, Hebrew, French, and English, Halaby served as a translator as well.

Following the war, the rise of Zionist terrorist attacks, specifically the bombing of the King David Hotel on July 22, 1946, caused the death of Nadia Wahbe, cousin of Sophie and Asia Halaby, and ninety-one other victims.

Halaby is also credited by historian Ellen Fleichmann to have worked within the Arab Legion, as a liaison officer between the Jordanian Army and the United Nations in 1948.

== Life in the new Palestine and the preservation of Palestinian culture and embroidery ==
Palestinians throughout the levant would flee following the Nakba and rise of Israel and Zionist imperialism. The Halaby family was no different and was forced to leave their old home in the Old City and move to their new home in the Wadi al-Joz neighborhood (Nur al-Din Street), in what would be known as East Jerusalem.

Like her sister, Asia traveled to Paris in 1948–1949. When they returned, their family had scattered across Lebanon, Jordan, or passed away. being well-off from their family's wealth, the sisters led an active social and social-activist lifestyles.

Asia Halaby would work briefly within the Red Cross and the United Nations Relief and Works Agency (UNRWA). She would also work for the Jordanian government at the Jerusalem Airport north of the city.

Following these temporary occupations, Asia's story becomes more human-centric. Beginning in the early 1950s, Halaby would begin and establish the Arab Refugee Handicrafts Centre. It is here that Halaby would set-up and develop workshops where impoverished and displayed Arab women could work and support their families following the Nakba. According to Laura Schor, Asia began to understand and value Palestinian crafts like embroidery. For Palestinians, the craft would be village centered, and the patterns would be specific to a tribe or village. Upon starting, Halaby supported 25-25 women within Jericho and Hebron, with numbers growing a decade later to 700–1500, with more than half a million items being produced.

Halaby would import fabrics from France and eventually set-up a shop on Zahra Street within the Old City and began to sell the embroidered fabric: tablecloths, pillowcases, sheets, and napkins. In the 1960s the cultural products were sought after by tourists, ambassadors, and Palestinians alike. In a way to also promote Sophie Halaby's artwork, Asia would include a postcard with her paintings with a purchase of a fabric.

According to an embroidery expert, and a Palestinian cultural and ethic art collector, Widad Kawar, assigned Asia and Sophie Halaby as "having saved Palestinian embroidery traditions after 1948" as the sisters not only made fabrics, they collected embroidered dresses.

Halaby briefly also ventured into rudimentary archeology, working closely with Kathleen Kenyon and James Pritchard, which developed to an increase in roles and responsibilities. Asia was later listed as a cataloger of the biblical town of Gibeon in the 1960s. She would also collect artifacts from the excavation of the cemetery at Tel al-Sa'diyya, displaying the history in her home.

By the time Asia was fifty-eight, Israel seized the West Bank, East Jerusalem, and Gaza in the 1967 Six-Day War. Her home was quickly conquered by Israeli troops. The sisters were told at gunpoint to leave the house, while troops searched their home. Soon after, the Israeli troops left, and Jordanian troops sought refuge in their home. The sisters took them in for several says and gave them civilian clothes to sneak out of the house.

== Legacy and contributions to Palestinian art and culture ==
Asia was very much a social activist, protesting Israeli control and military rule. In fact, in March 1968, Halaby was actively participating in the Women's protest- it is unknown whether she was beaten or jailed like other participants. Later in 1969, she was detained at al-Moskobiyya Detention Center in Jerusalem and forced to sign a document agreeing to not protest anymore-she did not agree and was later released.

Halaby would continue to protest Israeli policies and was frequently arrested by the military. She, having a background in archeology, would observe and monitor Israeli archeology and its changing of the physical and intellectual narrative surrounding the history of the land. To the point, Asia Halaby would often give tours to foreign guests observing the destruction of the Holy City.

Both of the sisters were active in women's rights as well by wearing pants in the 60's and by focusing on charitable gifts by upper-class women (an older form of feminism).

This person, a person of labels and heroics, embodied preservation within an age of turmoil and change for Palestinians in the post-World War II period. By preserving Palestinian embroidery, she allowed generations of decedents a way to preserve village and tribal identity. By resisting Israeli occupation, she developed peaceful resistance tactics. Per Ellen Fleischmann:

[Asia] Halaby was a unique woman for her time and place, impressing others of her generation who still recollect her unusual character and exploits. Raja al-‘Isa (the son of ‘Isa al-‘Isa, the owner of the newspaper Filastin), commented, “Asia is a tough guy . . . she’s two men in one woman.” Her story illustrates how women used organizational or associational structures, even within the mandate government itself, in order to seek fulfillment in nontraditional roles.

— Ellen Fleischmann, The Nation and Its “New” Women: The Palestinian Women’s Movement, 1920-1948., Berkeley: University of California Press, 2003.

Asia Halaby died February 12, 1998, nine months after her sister, Sophie.
