= Lifta =

Depopulated village in Mandatory Palestine

Lifta لفتا Lefta
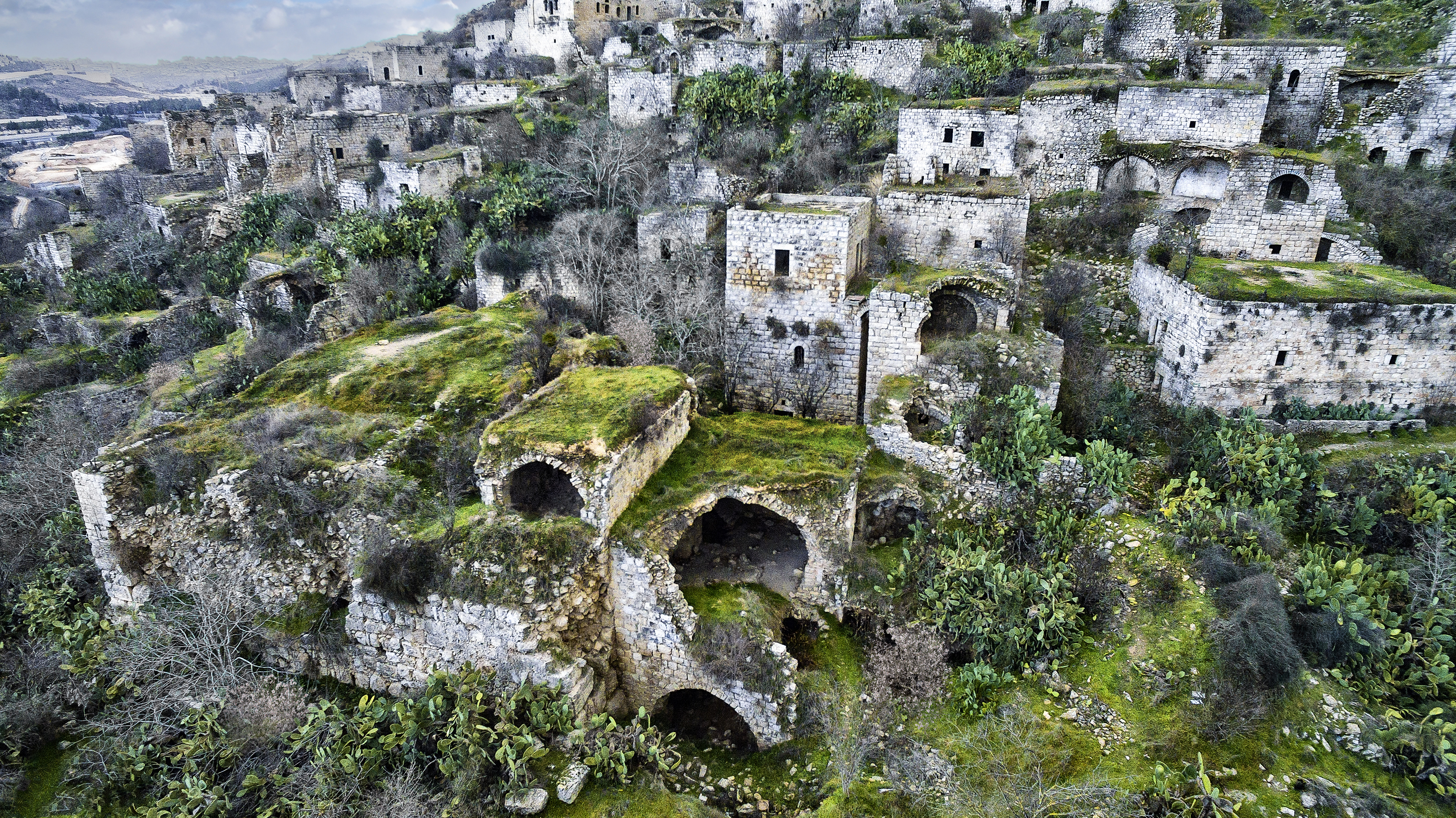
- Depopulated homes of the village of Lifta
- Etymology: Lifta, personal name
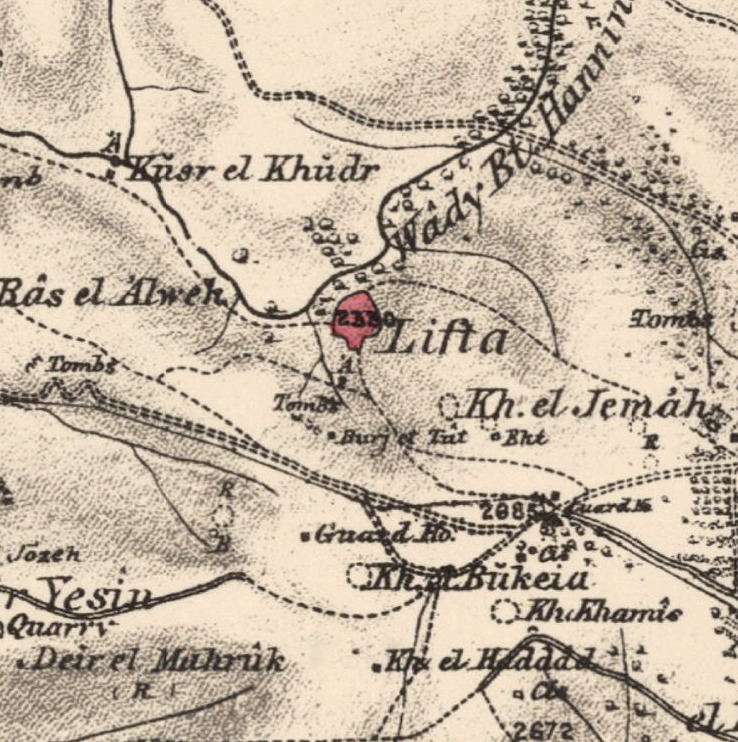
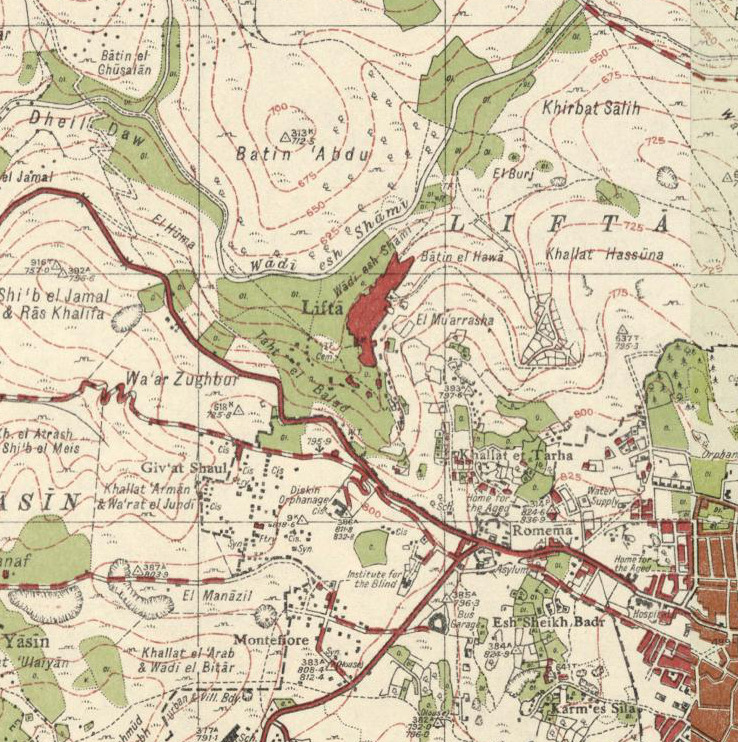
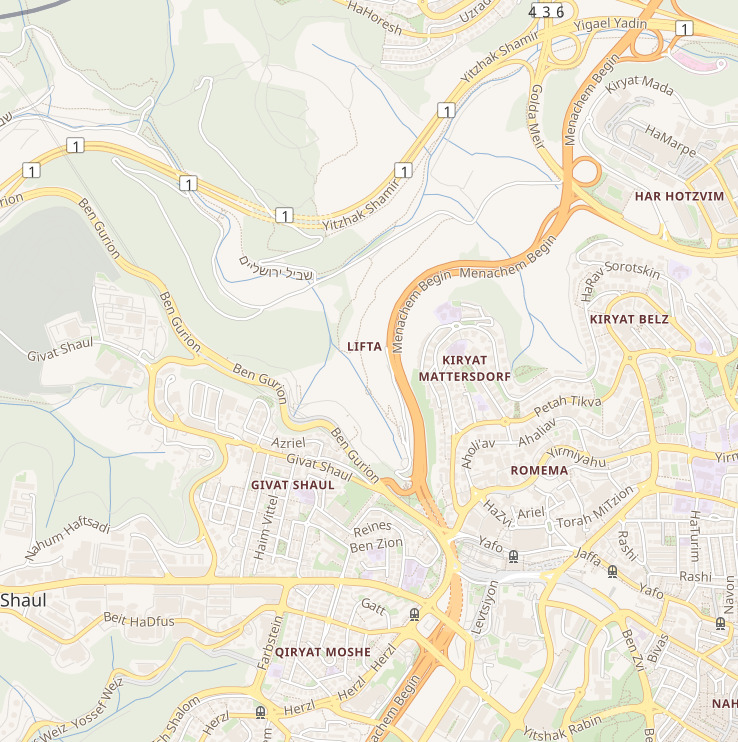
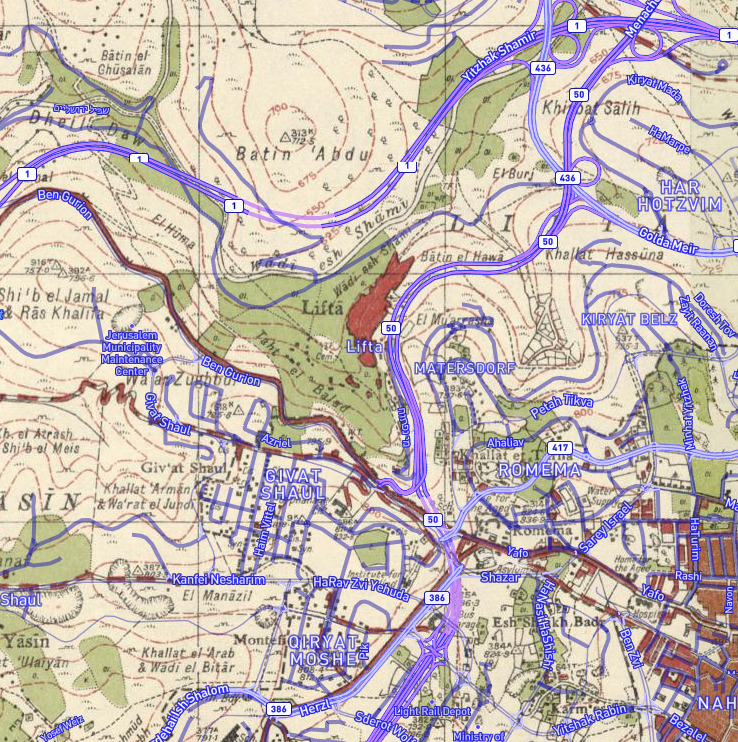
- 1870s map 1940s map modern map 1940s with modern overlay map A series of historical maps of the area around Lifta (click the buttons)

- Location within Mandatory Palestine
- Coordinates: 31°47′43″N 35°11′47″E
- Palestine grid: 168/133
- Geopolitical entity: Mandatory Palestine
- Subdistrict: Jerusalem
- Date of depopulation: January 1948
- Repopulated dates: 1948–2017 by Jews

Area
  - Total: 8,743 dunams (8.743 km^{2}; 3.376 sq mi)

Population (1948)
  - Total: 2,958
- Cause(s) of depopulation: Military assault by Zionist paramilitary forces
- Current Localities: Western suburb of Jerusalem

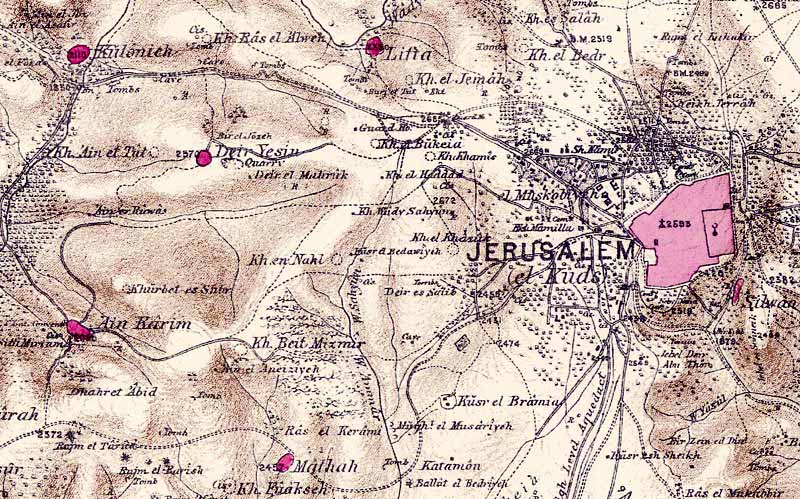
Lifta in relation to Jerusalem in the 1870s

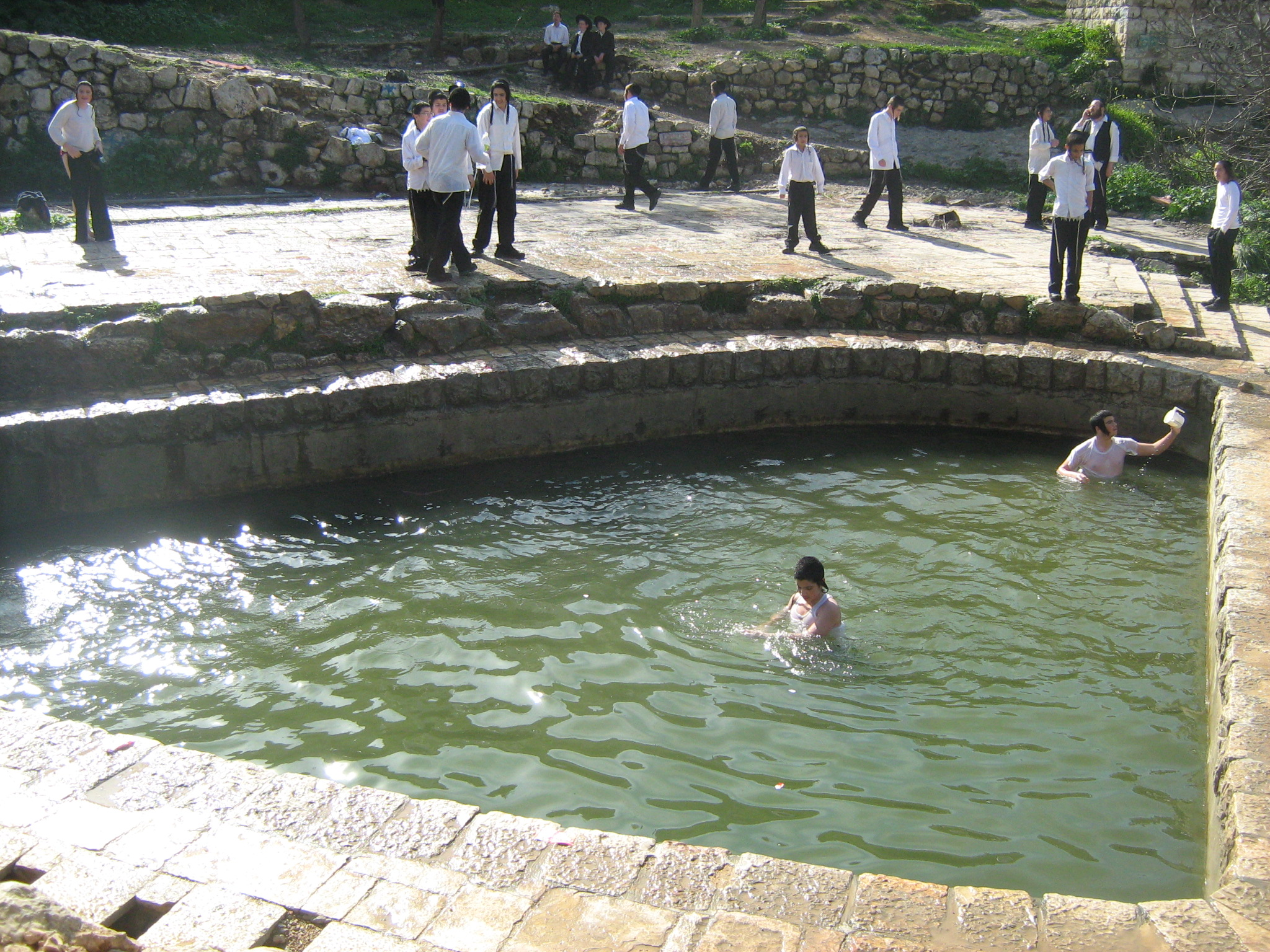
Lifta spring

Lifta (Arabic: لفتا; Hebrew: ליפתא) was a Palestinian village on the outskirts of Jerusalem. The village's Palestinian Arab inhabitants were expelled by Zionist paramilitary forces during the 1948 Palestine war.

During the Ottoman period, the village was recorded to have a population of 400 Arabs, all Muslim households. In 1834, a battle took place in the village during the Palestinian Peasants' Revolt. A British 1922 census registered Lifta's population at 1,451, all Muslims.

Prior to 1948, the village had orchards, several olive presses, a winepress, in addition to a modern clinic, two coffeehouses, two carpentry shops, barbershops, a butcher, and a mosque. In the 1945 statistics the population of Lifta was 2,250; 2,230 Muslims and 20 Christians. In addition, a small number of Jews resided in the village, and one former Jewish inhabitant described the relationship her family and the Palestinian Arab majority as 'excellent'.

During the 1948 Palestine war, a massacre occurred on 28 December 1947, when a Jewish militia launched a machine-gun and grenade assault on a cafe in Lifa. The mukhtar's home was also incinerated by the Zionist forces and 20 buildings were blown up as the village was put under siege. In July 2017, Israel declared Lifta (called Mei Neftoach) as a national nature reserve. It has been referred to as the "Palestinian Pompeii".

== History ==
=== Antiquity ===
A perennial spring located in the channel's upper section is believed to be the site where the village first developed. Surrounding this spring, artifacts including a burial cave and pottery shards from the Middle Bronze Age II and Iron Age II periods were uncovered.

Archaeological remains dating as far back as Iron Age II have been found in the village.

==== Biblical identification ====
The site is considered by some to be identical with biblical Hebrew: מי נפתוח Mei Neftoach. It was populated since ancient times; "Nephtoah" (Hebrew: נפתח, lit. spring of the corridor) is mentioned in the Hebrew Bible as the border between the Israelite tribes of Judah and Benjamin, and was the northernmost demarcation point of the territory of the Tribe of Judah. Other scholars hold the identification to be plausible but by no means certain. Kitchener and Conder found the identification with Nephtoah unsatisfactory, and preferred to identify Lifta with Eleph of Benjamin (Joshua 18:28).

=== Roman and Byzantine empires ===
The Romans and Byzantines called it Nephtho, and the Crusaders referred to it as Clepsta.

=== Crusaders ===
The remains of a court-yard home from the Crusader period remains in the centre of the village.

=== Ottoman Empire ===
In 1596, Lifta was a village in the Ottoman Empire, nahiya (subdistrict) of Jerusalem under the liwa' (district) of Jerusalem, and it had a population 72 Muslim households, an estimated 396 persons. It paid taxes on wheat, barley, olives, fruit orchards and vineyards; a total of 4,800 akçe. All of the revenue went to a waqf.

In 1834, a battle took place here, during the revolt of that year. The Egyptian Ibrahim Pasha and his army fought and defeated local rebels, led by Shaykh Qasim al-Ahmad, a prominent local ruler. However, the Qasim al-Ahmad family remained powerful and ruled the region southwest of Nablus from their fortified villages of Deir Istiya and Bayt Wazan some 40 kilometers (25 mi) due north of Lifta. In 1838 Edward Robinson noted Lifta as a Muslim village, located in the Beni Malik area, west of Jerusalem. Robinson hired muleteers from Lifta, noting that in Lifta "every peasant keeps his mule and usually accompanies it".

In 1863 Victor Guérin described Lifta as being surrounded by gardens of lemon-trees, oranges, figs, pomegranates, alms and apricots. An Ottoman village list of about 1870 indicated 117 houses and a population of 395, though the population count included men, only.

The PEF's Survey of Western Palestine in 1883 described it as a village on the side of a steep hill, with a spring and rock-cut tombs to the south.

In 1896 the population of Lifta was estimated to be about 966 persons.

In 1907 the German historian Gustav Rothstein was invited to Lifta by his Arabic language teacher, Elias Nasrallah Haddad. Rothstein wrote a 20-pages article describing the marriage celebrations and religious festivals in Lifta.

=== British Mandate ===
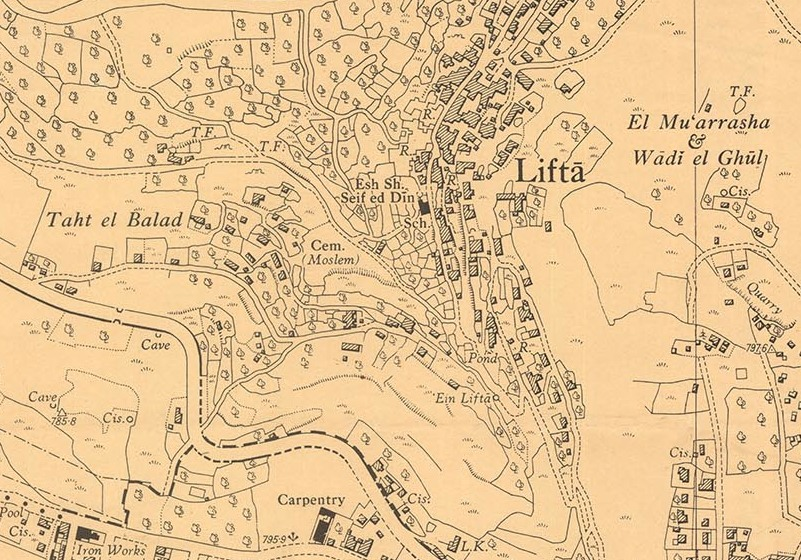
Lifta in the 1940s Survey of Palestine map

In 1917, Lifta surrendered to the British forces with white flags and, as a symbolic gesture, the keys to the village.

In the 1922 census of Palestine, Lifta had a population 1,451, all Muslims, increasing in the 1931 census (when Lifta was counted with "Shneller's Quarter"), to 1,893; 1,844 Muslims, 35 Jews and 14 Christians, in a total of 410 houses.

During the 1929 Palestine riots, according to one Israeli source, some villagers from Lifta were among gangs that participated in a number of robberies and attacks on nearby Jewish communities.

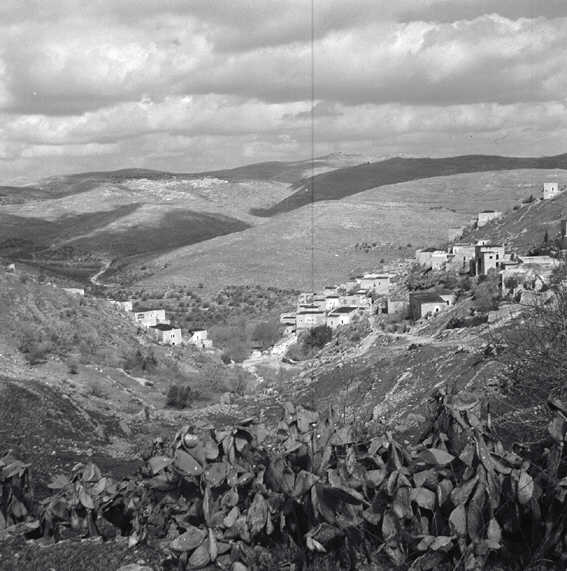
Lifta 1945

In the 1945 statistics the population of Lifta was 2,250; 2,230 Muslims and 20 Christians, and the total land area was 8,743 dunams, according to an official land and population survey. 3,248 dunams were for cereals, while 324 dunams were built-up (urban) land.

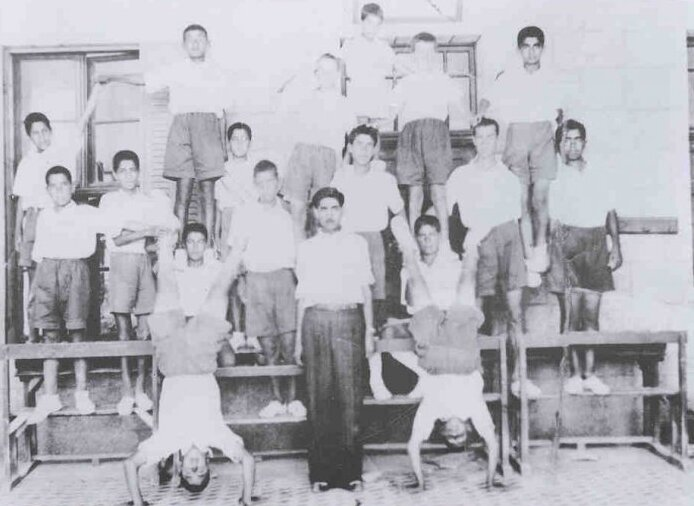
Lifta classroom picture with teacher Mohammad Rabi' in the middle, 1947

Prior to 1948, the village, with a population of some 2,500 people, had orchards, several olive presses, a winepress, in addition to a modern clinic, two coffeehouses, two carpentry shops, barbershops, a butcher, and a mosque. A small number of Jews resided in the village, and one former Jewish inhabitant described the relationship her family and the Palestinian majority as 'excellent'.

==== 1948 war and depopulation ====
In the 1947–48 Civil War in Mandatory Palestine Lifta, Romema, and Shaykh Badr which were strategically located on the road leaving Jerusalem to Tel-Aviv, were an operational priority for Jewish forces. Some families had already left the village after a decision had been made somewhat earlier on 4 December, to evacuate its women and children, in order to host a military company, and on 4 December 1947 some Arab families left. By mid-December irregular Arab militia took up positions in Lifta to defend the site. Hagannah patrols engaged in firefights with the village militiamen while Irgun and Lehi were even more aggressive.

On 28 December 1947, the village suffered from what survivors called the Lifta massacre when a Jewish militia launched a machine-gun and grenade assault on the café of Salah Eisa. In order to warn residents that they should evacuate, the mukhtar's home was incinerated, and 20 buildings blown up as the village was put under siege. (Note: Some sources place the cafe in Lifta (Morris 2004) (Levy21), and some in Romema (Krystall 1999) - which are adjacent to each other) The attack left seven dead, and more women and children left the village.

The village was suffering from food shortages in the beginning of January. Subsequently, a number of the villagers returned home, with Benny Morris reporting "some, or most" doing so. Subsequently, Abd al-Qadir al-Husayni, while visiting the village, ordered the women, children and elderly to evacuate and the men to stay put. On 29 January, a Lehi raid blew up 3 houses in the village. By early February the village was abandoned by the irregular militia. Benny Morris lists the cause of the depopulation of the village as being a military assault on the settlement.

According to one resident, interviewed in 2021, there were are around 40,000 descendants of the original refugee population, dispersed in East Jerusalem, the West Bank, Jordan and the Palestinian diaspora. Several families still retain their Ottoman period property deeds, attesting to their ownership of parts of Lifta.

=== Israel ===
==== 20th century ====
After the expulsion of its Palestinian villagers, of Lifta's 410 homes, 60 stone houses, some three stories high, remained, together with its mosque, an olive press, and a tiled pathway to a spring. It is listed by Unesco as a potential World Heritage Site, and in 2018, the World Heritage Fund registered the village among a list of 24 heritage sites that were endangered.

Lifta was used for Jewish refugee housing during the war, and following the war the Jewish Agency and the state of Israel settled Jewish immigrants from Yemen and Kurdistan in the village, totaling 300 families. However ownership of the houses was not registered in their name. Living conditions in Lifta were difficult, the buildings were in poor repair, poor roads and transport, and lack of electricity, water, and sanitation infrastructure. In 1969-71 most of the Jewish inhabitants of Lifta chose to leave as part of a compensation program by Amidar. Holes were drilled in the roofs of the evacuated buildings to make them less inhabitable, so that squatters wouldn't take up residence. 13 families, who lived in the portion of the village close to Highway 1 and didn't suffer from transportation issues chose to remain.

In the 1980s, Lifta was declared a municipal nature reserve under the auspices of the Israel Nature and Parks Authority.

In 1984, one of the abandoned buildings in the village was occupied by the "Lifta gang", a Jewish group plotting the blow up the mosques on the Temple Mount, who were stopped at the gates of the site with 250 pounds of explosives, hand grenades, and other armaments.

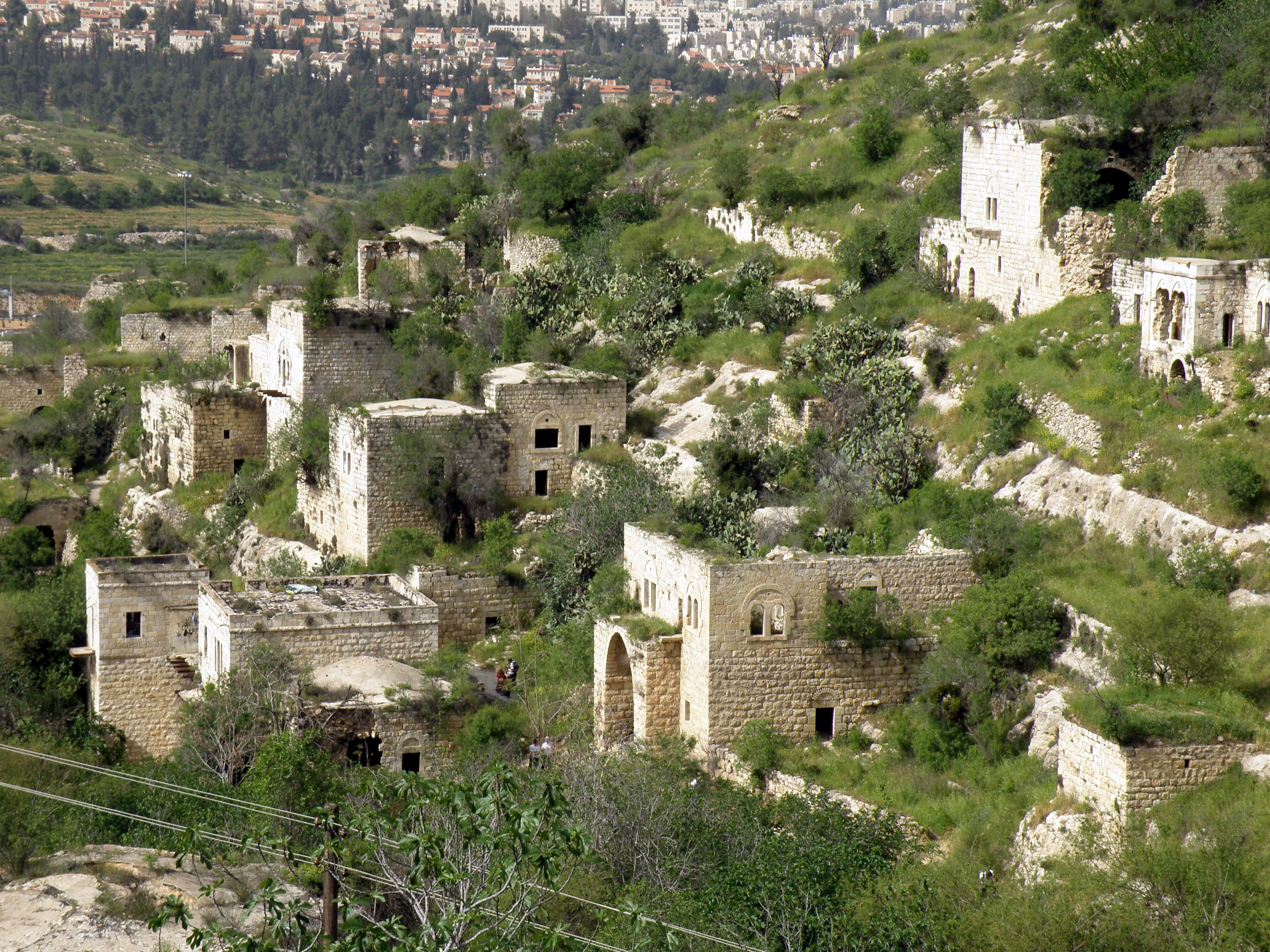
A view of Lifta, 2009

Following the departure of the Jewish residents, some of the buildings in the village were used for Lifta drug abuse rehabilitation center for adolescents, which was closed in 2014, and from 1971 for the Lifta high school, an open education school, which relocated to German Colony, Jerusalem in 2001.

==== 21st century ====
In 2010, an archaeological survey was conducted at Lifta by Mordechai Heiman on behalf of the Israel Antiquities Authority (IAA).

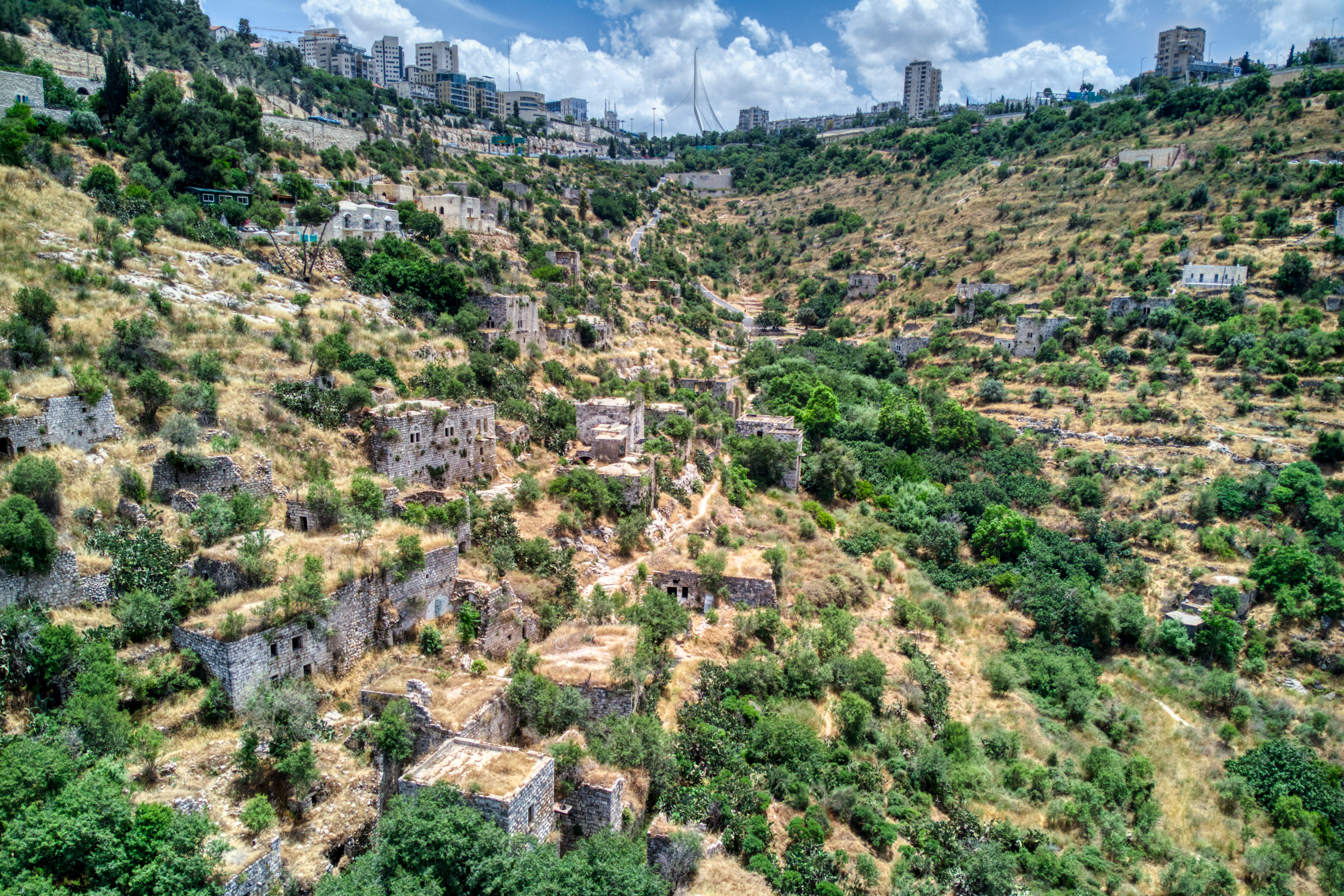
View of Lifta, 2023

In 2011, plans were announced to demolish the village and build a luxury development consisting of 212 luxury housing units and a hotel. Former residents brought a legal petition to preserve the village as a historic site. Lifta was the last remaining Arab village that was depopulated to have not been either completely destroyed or re-inhabited. In 2012, the plans to rebuild the village as an upscale neighborhood were rejected by the Jerusalem District Court.

By 2011, three books about the Palestinian village history had been published.

In June 2017 the last Jewish residents left the village following a settlement with the government who acknowledged they were not squatters but rather resettled in Lifta by the appropriate authorities. In July 2017 Mei Neftoach was declared a national nature reserve. 55 out of 450 pre-1948 stone houses are still standing.

In 2021, the Israel Land Administration, without informing beforehand the Jerusalem Municipality authorities, announced on Jerusalem Day that it was reported to be preparing a tender for the construction of a luxury neighborhood on the village's ruins, projected to consist of 259 villas, a hotel, and a mall. On 11 August 2022, the plan to demolish Lifta and build luxury housing was shelved, with new Jerusalem mayor Moshe Lion seeking to preserve the village of Lifta and transform it into a UNESCO World Heritage Site. The previous Mayor of Jerusalem, Israeli businessman and politician Nir Barkat, had initially approved the plan for Lifta's demolition before changing his mind, opposing the development plans after visiting the site. Currently, Lifta is still on the list of UNESCO's tentative World Heritage Sites.

== Arab traditional dress ==
Lifta was among the wealthiest communities in the Jerusalem area, and the women were known for their fine embroidery Thob Ghabani bridal dresses were sewn in Lifta. They were made of ghabani, a natural cotton covered with gold color silk floral embroidery produced in Aleppo, and were narrower than other dresses. The sleeves were also more tapered. The sides, sleeves and chest panel of the dress were adorned with silk insets. The dresses were ordered by brides in Bethlehem. The married women of Lifta wore a distinctive conical shaṭweh head-dress, that was also worn in Bethlehem, Ayn Karim, Beit Jala and Beit Sahour.

== Notable people ==
- Rasmea Odeh
- Yahya Hammuda

== See also ==
- Ali Abunimah
- List of modern names for biblical place names
- Palestinian costumes
- Zochrot

== Bibliography ==
- Avner, Rina (18 January 2008). "Jerusalem, Lifta Final Report" (120). Hadashot Arkheologiyot–Excavations and Surveys in Israel.
- Barclay, James Turner (1858). The city of Great King; or, Jerusalem as it was. Philadelphia: J. Challen and sons [etc.] (p. 544)
- Barron, J.B., ed. (1923). Palestine: Report and General Abstracts of the Census of 1922. Government of Palestine.
- Berchem, van, M. (1927). MIFAO 44 Matériaux pour un Corpus Inscriptionum Arabicarum Part 2 Syrie du Sud T.2 Jérusalem Haram. Cairo: Impr. de l'Institut français d'archéologie orientale. (no. 293, pp. 436−437)
- Berchem, van, M. (1920). MIFAO 45.1 Matériaux pour un Corpus Inscriptionum Arabicarum Part 2 Syrie du Sud T.3 Jérusalem Index général. Cairo: Impr. de l'Institut français d'archéologie orientale. (plate LVIII)
- Conder, C.R.; Kitchener, H.H. (1883). The Survey of Western Palestine: Memoirs of the Topography, Orography, Hydrography, and Archaeology. Vol. 3. London: Committee of the Palestine Exploration Fund.
- Dagan, Yehuda; Barda, Leticia (26 December 2010). "Jerusalem, Lifta Survey Final Report" (122). Hadashot Arkheologiyot – Excavations and Surveys in Israel.
- Dauphin, C. (1998). La Palestine byzantine, Peuplement et Populations. BAR International Series 726 (in French). Vol. III : Catalogue. Oxford: Archeopress. ISBN 0-860549-05-4. (p. 900)
- Gilbert, Major Vivian (1936): The Romance of the last Crusade, London, UK
- Government of Palestine, Department of Statistics (1945). Village Statistics, April, 1945.
- Guérin, V. (1868). Description Géographique Historique et Archéologique de la Palestine (in French). Vol. 1: Judee, pt. 1. Paris: L'Imprimerie Nationale.
- Hadawi, S. (1970). Village Statistics of 1945: A Classification of Land and Area ownership in Palestine. Palestine Liberation Organization Research Center.
- Haiman, Mordechai (19 September 2011). "Jerusalem, Lifta Final Report" (123). Hadashot Arkheologiyot – Excavations and Surveys in Israel.
- Hartmann, M. (1883). "Die Ortschaftenliste des Liwa Jerusalem in dem türkischen Staatskalender für Syrien auf das Jahr 1288 der Flucht (1871)". Zeitschrift des Deutschen Palästina-Vereins. 6: 102–149.
- Hütteroth, W.-D.; Abdulfattah, K. (1977). Historical Geography of Palestine, Transjordan and Southern Syria in the Late 16th Century. Erlanger Geographische Arbeiten, Sonderband 5. Erlangen, Germany: Vorstand der Fränkischen Geographischen Gesellschaft. ISBN 3-920405-41-2.
- Khalidi, W. (1992). All That Remains: The Palestinian Villages Occupied and Depopulated by Israel in 1948. Washington D.C.: Institute for Palestine Studies. ISBN 0-88728-224-5.
- Mills, E., ed. (1932). Census of Palestine 1931. Population of Villages, Towns and Administrative Areas. Jerusalem: Government of Palestine.
- Morris, B. (2004). The Birth of the Palestinian Refugee Problem Revisited. Cambridge University Press. ISBN 978-0-521-00967-6.
- Palmer, E.H. (1881). The Survey of Western Palestine: Arabic and English Name Lists Collected During the Survey by Lieutenants Conder and Kitchener, R.E. Transliterated and Explained by E.H. Palmer. Committee of the Palestine Exploration Fund.
- Pringle, D. (1997). Secular buildings in the Crusader Kingdom of Jerusalem: an archaeological Gazetteer. Cambridge University Press. ISBN 0521460107.
- Robinson, E.; Smith, E. (1841). Biblical Researches in Palestine, Mount Sinai and Arabia Petraea: A Journal of Travels in the year 1838. Vol. 2. Boston: Crocker & Brewster.
- Robinson, E.; Smith, E. (1841). Biblical Researches in Palestine, Mount Sinai and Arabia Petraea: A Journal of Travels in the year 1838. Vol. 3. Boston: Crocker & Brewster.
- Rothstein, Gustav (1914). "Moslemische Hochzeitsgebrauche in Lifta bei Jerusalem". Palestine Journal (in German and Arabic). VI: 102 -123, 124-135.
- Schick, C. (1896). "Zur Einwohnerzahl des Bezirks Jerusalem". Zeitschrift des Deutschen Palästina-Vereins. 19: 120–127.
- Schölch, Alexander (1993). Palestine in Transformation, 1856-1882: Studies in Social, Economic, and Political Development (PDF). Institute for Palestine Studies. ISBN 978-0-88728-234-8.
- Socin, A. (1879). "Alphabetisches Verzeichniss von Ortschaften des Paschalik Jerusalem". Zeitschrift des Deutschen Palästina-Vereins. 2: 135–163.
- Stillman, Yedida Kalfon (1979). Palestinian Costume and Jewelry. Albuquerque: University of New Mexico Press. ISBN 0-8263-0490-7. (A catalog of the MOIFA (Museum of International Folk Art at Santa Fe's) collection of Palestinian clothing and jewellery.)
- Tobler, T. (1854). Dr. Titus Toblers zwei Bucher Topographie von Jerusalem und seinen Umgebungen (in German). Vol. 2. Berlin: G. Reimer. (pp. 758-60; cited in Pringle, 1997, p. 66)
- Zelinger, Yehiel (18 September 2011). "Jerusalem, Lifta, Final Report" (123). Hadashot Arkheologiyot – Excavations and Surveys in Israel.
