= Sophie Halaby =

Palestinian watercolorist

- صوفي حلابي
- Born: June 26, 1905; Jerusalem
- Died: May 22, 1997 (aged 91); Jerusalem
- Family: Anastasia (Asia) Halaby, Sister

Sophie Halaby (Arabic: صوفي حلابي; 1906–1997) was a Palestinian watercolorist who depicted Jerusalem and its surrounding landscapes. She was among the first Arab women to study art in Paris. Halaby's younger sister, Anastasia Halaby, established an embroidery workshop to employ impoverished women following the Palestinian Nakba. Halaby influenced later Palestinian artists, among them Samia Halaby (no relation) and Kamal Boullata.

== Life ==
Halaby was born to a Palestinian-Christian father, Jiryes (George) Nicola Halaby, and a Russian-Russian Orthodox mother, Olga Akimovna Khudobasheva, an elegant but imposing woman. She was named after her paternal grandmother and was the middle child of three children. Her parents met when her father was studying medicine in St. Petersburg, Russia and at the Kyiv Theological Academy, and moved back between Jerusalem and Kyiv until settling permanently in Jerusalem in 1917. As a child, Halaby was raised in Kiev, but following the Black Sea Raids in 1914 by the Ottoman Empire and the German Navy's on the Russian ports, with the onset of World War I, the family fled as they feared Olga would be subject to persecution. Upon returning to Palestine, the family settled and lived in Musrara, a well-off neighborhood in Jerusalem's New City. Halaby's family was one of high education: her father was a dragoman to the Russian Church, and her mother was a teacher. Halaby had two siblings, and in later life would live and work closely with her sister Anastasia (Asia), who ran an embroidery workshop.

Beginning in 1917, Halaby was educated at the English Girl's High School of Jerusalem (renamed Jerusalem Girls' College in 1922.) Her talents began to emerge during her time in school in her drawings of flowers. Her family being one of travel and education, the children spoke Russian, Arabic, English, and French. After graduating, she worked for the British Mandate government and participated in Jerusalem's thriving arts and literary scene with friends including George Aleef. In 1929 she received a scholarship to study art in Paris from the French government. She returned to Palestine just before the 1936 Great Arab Revolt. During this period she taught at a girl's college and published political cartoons critiquing British policies including the Balfour Declaration, and the premise that Palestine was a land without an existing population.

After the Nakba, she and her sister Asia moved to Nur Eddein Street in Wadi al-Joz, where they lived together until their deaths. Throughout their lives, the sisters exhibited and sold their arts and crafts, as well as inspiring younger artists.

== Educational travels ==
Aside from studying in Paris in the early 1930s, Halaby would also take at least three trips into Europe. She also traveled back to France in 1948–1949. In her independent studies, Halaby would be a focus into her maturing as an artist. According to family, she studied at the Sorbonne in France. Halaby also studied in Italy during the crisis on the Suez Canal in 1956. During her third trip to Europe, Sophie Halaby would credit Italy with finalizing her move into becoming a well-rounded painter.

== Teaching ==
After returning from Paris, Halaby taught at the Schmidt Girls' School until 1955. He paternal cousins, Sonia Wahbe & Louba Wahbe, also a painter, taught at the school as well.

== Work ==
Halaby is best remembered for her water colors, although she has worked with oil paints. The loose, even casual nature of Halaby's landscapes evoke an "atmospheric, dreamlike quality one might even consider melancholic." Halaby's watercolors depict the landscape surrounding Jerusalem without focus on religious sites or orientalist panoramas of the city. Instead, she painted the trees, and wildflowers that have gradually been lost to urbanization. According to Samia Halaby, "Sophie's landscapes are a precious record of the beauty of the land and the love affair Palestinians have with it." She was seemingly mesmerized with the area around Jerusalem in areas "devoid of human presence and even architecture. Tania Tamari Nasser, a writer and singer, has described how "Halaby's glowing color and her treatment of the wild flowers of Palestine inspired" her and her friends in their youth. One of these friends, Kamal Boullata, remembers checking the sisters' storefront exhibit for new paintings every day on his way to school.

Among many friends and family members, it was quite known that Halaby was private regarding her personal life and art. Specifically to her privacy, most of the closest people in her life were never allowed into her art studio. Nevertheless, Sophie Halaby would present her work in professional and informal settings, especially in ones with a focus on Palestinian culture. She held art in her sister's, Asia Halaby's, work studio.

== The Six Day War ==
During the Six-Day War, Halaby's home was searched by Israeli troops. Soon after, they left Jordanian troops sought refuge in their home. According to hearsay, Sophie and Asia Halaby kept ten soldiers safe for several days and helped them escape in civilian clothing.

== Legacy ==
Following the Arab-Israeli War (Six-Day War) in 1967, Palestinian artists from the West Bank, Gaza, and within the 1948 boundaries of Israel met to rediscover Palestinian culture and norms. In this way, these young artists began to plan resistance through art, and this meeting of young political minds eventual led to the creation of the League of Palestinian Artists or Rabita. In the 1970s and 1980s, these young leaders would focus on the relationship between art and politics and incorporate inclusivity within Palestinians and eventually Palestinian liberation.

Vera Tamari and Sliman Mansour led the movement and would hold exhibitions that led to many arrests, but also led to a revival of Palestinian independence movements through the messages of resistance to the occupation of Palestine by Israel.

Sophie Halaby, well within her 70's was not at the forefront of the movement, but still wished to support the youth-art movement. She would regularly attend art exhibits as an audience member, not joining in with the artists. That being said, she was very adamant that she was an artist first, regardless of political turmoil, refusing to join any of the art movements at the time. Yet, she still inspired those artist's born after the Nakba. She did continue her work in private and would attend conferences to learn about the Holy Land, Jerusalem. She would also assist her sister in the embroidery work for the poor in supplying clothing and blankets for the poor.

However, in 1986, Vera Tamari and Faten Toubasi organized an exhibit at the Hakawati Theatre in East Jerusalem, which was keyed by Halaby and other Palestinian-women artists. Halaby reluctantly joined this art installation. Through this exhibition, the work Tallat: Women's Art in Palestine was crafted, which included the art from ten artists and three works by Halaby, many of which held high-level art degrees. She allowed two landscapes (which are not documented) and a charcoal-portrait of an elderly man (dated 1930, from Sophie Halaby's days as a student in Paris) to be included. The model was a bearded man with longhair, who was only wearing shorts. His right hand, laying next to his thighs, but had a mixture of clear and fading lines. She may have chosen this image to show that she was widely believed to be the first Arab women to study art in France; but nevertheless, it was an oddity to include the man in a gallery about national-Palestinian symbols. Unfortunately no catalog of the exhibit was ever crafted and is only documented in a review by Al Fajr on November 28, 1986.

Both of the sisters were active in women's rights as well by wearing pants in the 60's and by focusing on charitable gifts by upper-class women (an older form of feminism).

She eventually, with her sister, reclused into old age and died within the age of the first Intifada. She was buried on the Mount of Olives she had painted so many times before next to her parents. Nine months later, her sister Asia Halaby would be buried next to her. Both of their graves were not marked with proper headstones. Much of her work was thrown away by her surviving relatives. Mazen Qupty and George al-Ama, both art collectors, saved some of her work, mostly watercolors.
