= Iznaq =

Chain traditionally worn by Palestinian women

The iznaq is a chin chain traditionally worn by Palestinian women, suspended from a headdress called the shatweh. It is crafted from hand-made silver chains and hooks, and festooned with Ottoman-era coins. It can include floral or star-shaped ornaments and a cross for Christians.

== Use ==
It was common for villagers to adorn themselves with modest iznaqs featuring either single or double chains; however, in Bethlehem and the surrounding villages, the iznaq included several chains and other intricate embellishments.

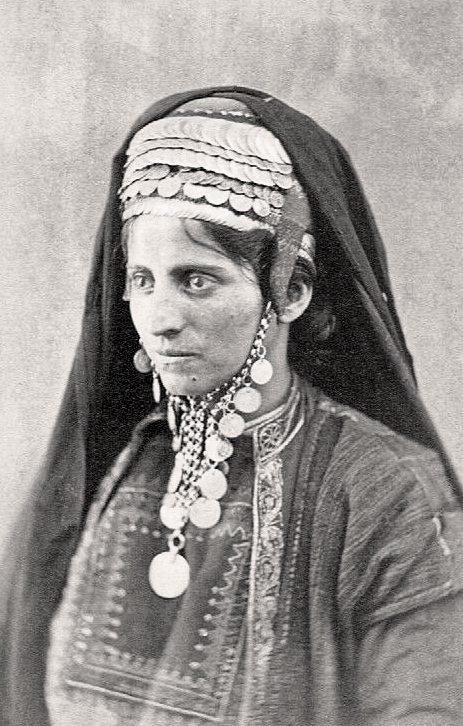
A woman from Bethlehem, 1870

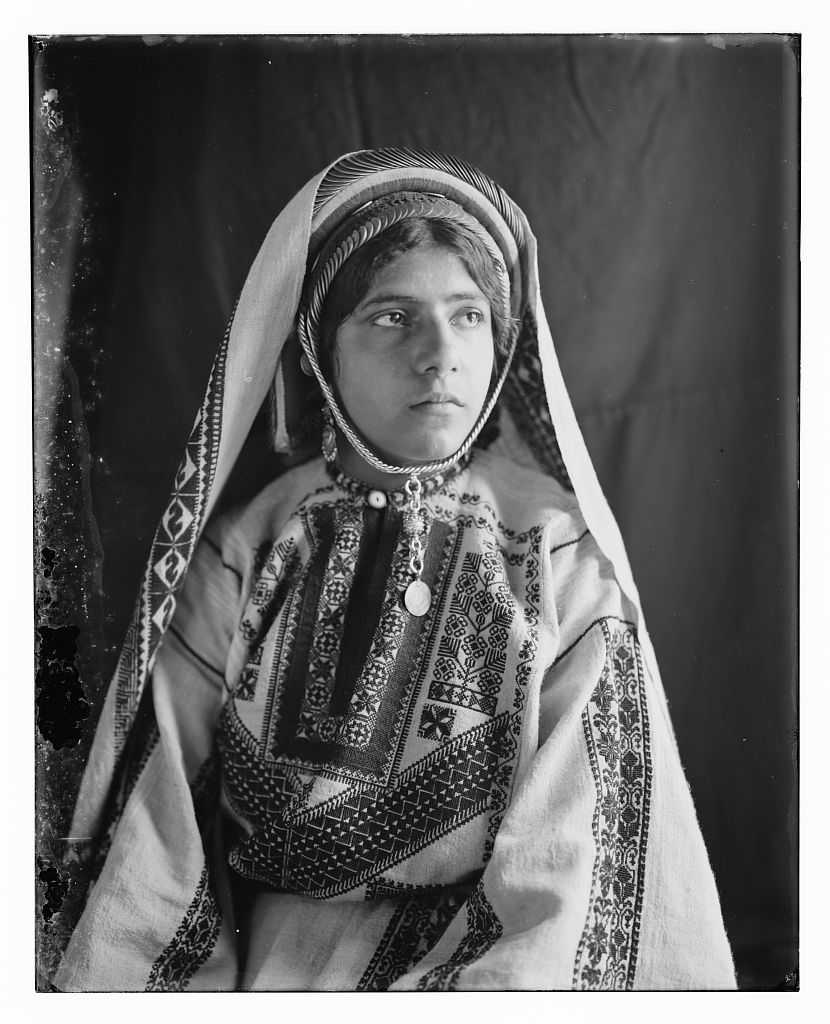
A woman from Bayt Nabala, 1933
