= Widad Kawar =

Palestinian ethnic and cultural art collector

Widad Kawar (Arabic: وداد قعوار) is a Palestinian art historian and collector of Palestinian and Jordanian ethnic and cultural arts. She has collected over 2,000 dresses, costumes, textiles, and jewelry over 50 years, seeking to preserve a culture that has been largely dispersed by conflict. Kawar is known as Umm l'ibas al-falastini—the mother of Palestinian dress.

== Biography ==
Kawar was born in Tulkarm city to a Palestinian Christian family in 1931. Her family moved to Bethlehem in 1941. Her father Jalil was a teacher and head of juvenile school system in British Mandate government of Palestine. She studied at the American University of Beirut.

Kawar has made her collection available for public viewing and has mounted exhibits of Palestinian dress around the world. She has written many books on Palestinian embroidery and is seeking to establish a Gallery of Cultural Embroidery . She collaborated with Margaret Skinner on A Treasury of Stitches: Palestinian Embroidery Motifs, 1850–1950 (Rimal/Melisende). She additionally wrote Threads of Identity: Preserving Palestinian Costume and Heritage (Rimal/Melisende).

Widad is a member of the Board of Trustees of the American Center for Oriental Research. She has established the Tiraz Centre which runs small museum in Amman, housing her collection and dedicated to the preservation of Palestinian and Jordanian cultural traditions.

In 2012, Kawar won the Prince Klaus International Award for culture and development.

== Published work ==
- Skinner, Margarita; Kawar, Widad Kamel (2014). Palestinian Embroidery Motifs: A Treasury of Stitches, 1850-1950. Melisende.
- Kawar, Widad (2011). Threads of Identity: Preserving Palestinian Costume and Heritage. Rimal Publications. ISBN 978-9963-610-41-9.
- Kawar, Widad; Weir, Shelagh. Costumes and Wedding Customs in Bayt Dajan.
- Kawar, Widad; Nasir, Tania (1992). Palestinian Embroidery : Traditional "Fallahi" Cross-Stitch. Munich: State Museum of Ethnography. ISBN 3-927270-04-0.
- Kawar, Widad (1987). Pracht Und Geheimnis - Kleidung Und Schmuck Aus Palästina Und Jordanien (in German). Rautenstrauch-Joest Museum Munich. ISBN 3-923158-15-7.

== See also ==
- Palestinian costumes
