= Aida (given name) =

- Pronunciation: /ɑːˈiːdə/
- Gender: Female
- Language: Arabic, Persian, Turkish, Latin, Swahili, Armenian, Italian, Finnish, Spanish, Swedish

Origin
- Origin: Arabic
- Meaning: “Happy”, "Returning", "Helper", "Distinguished", "moon", "Gift"

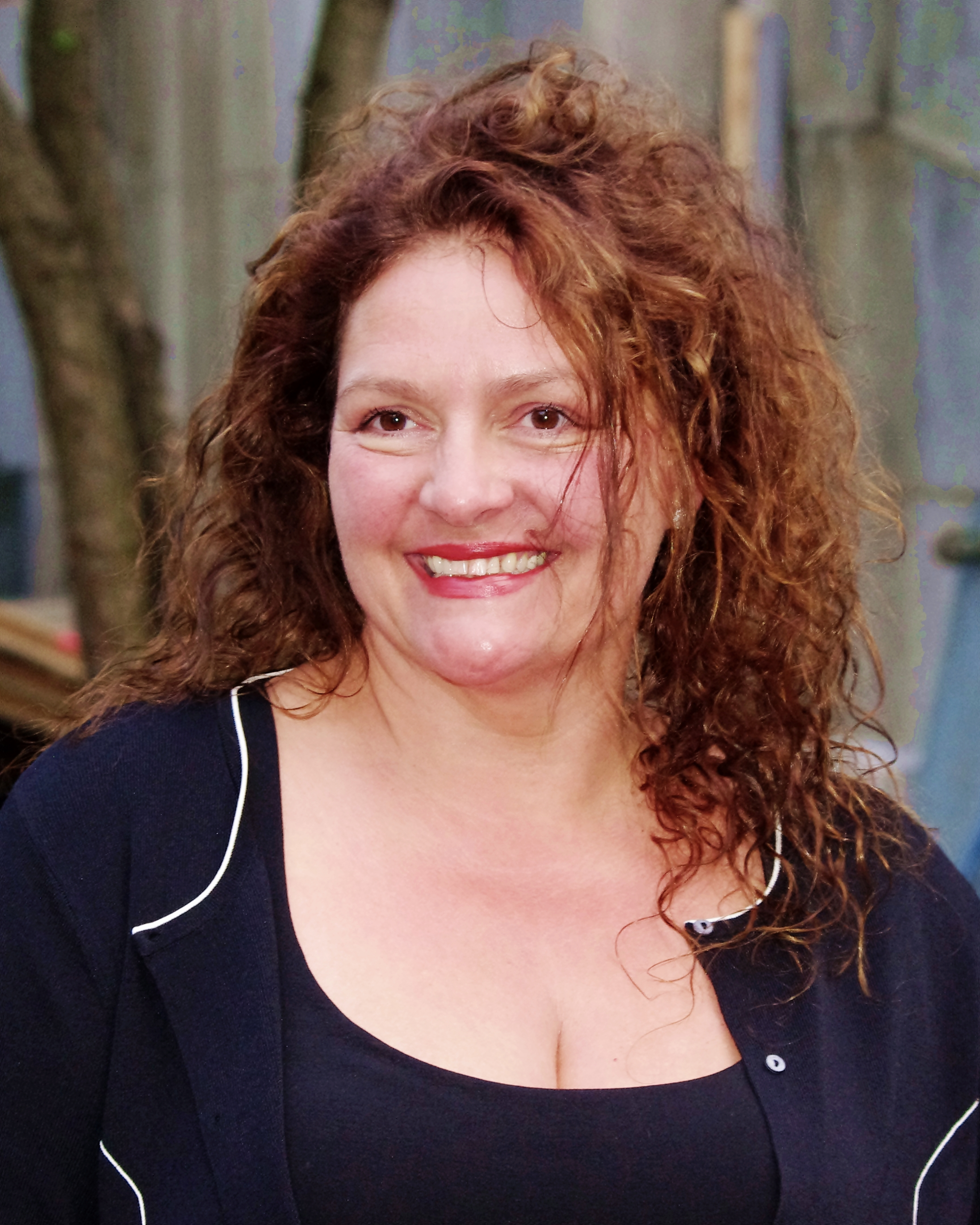
Actress Aida Turturro, in 2012.

Aida or Aïda is a female given name of Arabic origin.

== Variants ==
The name was used by Auguste Mariette for his sketch of the plot which Giuseppe Verdi later used for his opera of the same title, Aida. In the Italian opera, Aida is an Ethiopian princess. Mariette claimed that the name was authentically Egyptian, writing in a letter "Don't be alarmed by the title. Aida is an Egyptian name. Normally it would be Aita. But that name would be too harsh, and the singers would irresistibly soften it to Aida." It may be derived from a name recorded on the Rosetta Stone.

Unrelated to this origin, the Italian meaning for Aida is "Happy". "Aida" is also sometimes traced to other African languages. Aida (相田) is also a Japanese surname.

== Notable people named Aida ==
- Aída Álvarez (born 1950), Puerto Rican politician and journalist
- Aida el Ayoubi (born 1961), Egyptian singer
- Aida Badić (born 1986), Croatian artistic gymnast
- Aida Bamia, professor emeritus of Arabic language and literature at the University of Florida in Gainesville
- Aida Baraku (born 1971), Albanian Kosovar singer, composer, journalist and television producer
- Aida Begić (born 1976), Bosnian film director and screenwriter
- Aida Chalhoub (born 1951), Lebanese singer
- Aida Čorbadžić (born 1976), Bosnian opera singer
- Aida Cuevas (born 1963), Mexican ranchera music singer and actress
- Aida Delgado-Colon (born 1955), chief United States District Judge for the District of Puerto Rico
- Aida Desta (1927–2013), eldest granddaughter of Emperor Haile Selassie of Ethiopia
- Aïda Mady Diallo, French-born Malian novelist and director
- Aida Diestro (1924–1973), Cuban pianist and director of the vocal group Cuarteto d'Aida
- Aida Edemariam, Ethiopian-Canadian journalist based in the UK
- Aida Karina Estrada (born 1987), Guatemalan beauty pageant winner
- Aida Fariscal (born 1940), Filipino police officer
- Aida Folch (born 1986), Catalan Spanish actress
- Aida Fustuq, Lebanese former wife of Saudi ruler King Abdullah
- Aída García Naranjo (born 1951), Peruvian educator, singer, and politician
- Aida Garifullina (born 1987), Russian opera singer
- Aida González (born 1962), Panamanian writer and doctor
- Aida Hadzialic (born 1987), Swedish politician
- Aida Imanguliyeva (1939–1992), Azerbaijani academic
- Aida Jordão, Portuguese-Canadian playwright
- Aida Khakimzhanova (born 2008), Kazakh rhythmic gymnast
- Aida El-Khadra, American particle physicist
- Aida El-Kashef (born 1988), feminist Egyptian film-maker, actress and director
- Aída Kemelmajer (born 1945), Argentine jurist
- Aida Lafuente (1915–1934), Spanish teenage revolutionary
- Aida Mahmudova (born 1982), Azerbaijan artist
- Aida Mbodj (born 1955), Senegalese politician, Vice-President of the National Assembly of Senegal
- Aida Mohamed (born 1976), Hungarian foil fencer
- Aida Mohammadkhani (born 1987), Iranian actress
- Aida Muluneh (born 1974), photographer
- Aida Najjar (1938–2020), Palestinian-Jordanian writer
- Aida Navarro (born 1937), Venezuelan mezzo-soprano
- Aida Nikolaychuk (born 1982), Ukrainian pop singer and model
- Aida Nuño Palacio (born 1983), Spanish female cyclo-cross cyclist
- Aida Reyna (born 1950), Peruvian volleyball player
- Aida Rodriguez (born 1977), American comedian, actress, producer and writer
- Aïda Ruilova (born 1974), American contemporary artist
- Aida Shanayeva (born 1986), Russian foil fencer
- Aida Steshenko (born 1968), Turkmen table tennis player
- Aida Tağızada (1934–2025), Azerbaijani musicologist
- Aida Toledo (born 1952), Guatemalan poet, short story writer, non-fiction writer and educator
- Aida Tomescu (born 1955), Australian painter
- Aida Touma-Suleiman (born 1964), Israeli Arab journalist and politician
- Aida Turturro (born 1962), American actress
- Aida Vedishcheva (born 1941), Soviet and Russian singer of Jewish descent
- Aida Overton Walker (1880–1914), American vaudeville performer, actress, singer, dancer and choreographer
- Aida Ward (1900–1984), American jazz singer
- Aida Woolf (1886–1967), British dress designer
- Aída Yéspica (born 1982), Venezuelan beauty pageant
