= List of Palestinians =

This List of Palestinians is of notable Palestinian people. Approximately 12 million people today identify as Palestinian. as defined in the Palestinian National Charter of 1968.

This list is chronologically restricted to the period since the creation of Mandatory Palestine in 1920, and definitionally restricted to the modern national rather than the merely geographical meaning of Palestinian. As such, it does not include Palestinian Jews or other Israeli citizens who may be native to the geographic region of Palestine, unless they identify and are recognised as part of the Palestinian national collective. Today, "almost all Palestinian Jews identify themselves as Israelis."

For a list of notable people from Palestine, not bounded by the modern national definition of Palestinian, and prior to the British Mandate, see List of people from Palestine (historical region).

Name	Field	Speciality	Place of birth	Year of birth
Aref al-Aref	Literature	historian, journalist, politician	Jerusalem	1891
Nahil Bishara	Art	painter, sculptor, crafts	Jerusalem	1919
Fatima al-Budeiri	Radio broadcaster	news, literature, women's issues	Jerusalem	1923
Henry Cattan	Literature	jurist, author	Jerusalem	1906
Bandali al-Jawzi	Academia	linguistics	Jerusalem	1871
Aida Najjar	Academia	historian	Lifta	1936
Ibrahim Tuqan	Literature	poet	Nablus	1905
Dimitri Baramki	Archaeology	archaeology, scholar	Jerusalem	1909
Yusra	Archaeology	archaeologist, discovered Tabun neanderthal skull	Ijzim or Jaba'	c. early 1900s
Moain Sadeq	Archaeology	Islamic archaeology	Khan Yunis	
Fadel al-Utol	Archaeology	Archaeology of Gaza	Al-Shati refugee camp	1981
Farah Baker	Social media	Reporter	Gaza Strip	1998
Mo Amer	Comedy	Stand-up comedian	Kuwait	1981
Said Durrah	Comedy	Stand-up comedian	USA	1982
Marie-Alphonsine Danil Ghattas	Religion (Christian)	Nun and saint	Jerusalem	1843
Maysoon Zayid	Comedy	Stand-up comedian	USA	1974
Abeer Abu Ghaith	Business	technology entrepreneur, and social activist	Jordan	c. 1985
Khaled Al-Hassan	Politics (Fatah)	political theorist, author, Fatah & PLO leader	Haifa	1928
Lila Abu Lughod	Academia	professor, anthropology, women and gender studies	USA	1952
Salman Abu Sitta	Academia	Palestinian studies	Beersheba	1938
Imad-ad-Dean Ahmad	Academia	academic	USA	1948
Mai al-Kaila	Politics	health minister, ambassador	Jerusalem	1955
Plestia Alaqad	Journalism	journalist	Gaza Strip	2001
Awad Saud Awad	Journalism, Academia	Author on Palestinian folklore, journalist	Jubb Yusuf	1943
Motaz Azaiza	Journalism	photojournalist	Deir al-Balah	1999
Fatima Hassouna	Journalism	photojournalist	Gaza City	1999
Bisan Owda	Journalism	Journalist, activist, filmmaker	Beit Hanoun	
Rashad al-Shawwa	Politics	Mayor of Gaza City (1971 – 1982)	Gaza City	1909
Izzat Darwaza	Academia	historian, politician, educator	Nablus	1888
Samih Farsoun	Academia	sociologist	Haifa	1937
Ismail al-Faruqi	Academia	philosopher and comparative religions professor	Jaffa	1921
Leila Farsakh	Academia	Middle East, politics	Jordan	1967
Sami Hadawi	Academia	land specialist and researcher	Jerusalem	1904
Nemahsis	Music	Singer-songwriter	Toronto	1994
Ameer Idreis	Literature	Writer, playwright, urbanist	Dubai	1999
Wasif Jawhariyyeh	Music	Oud composer	Jerusalem	1897
Rashid Khalidi	Academia	historian	USA	1948
Ismail Khalidi	Academia	historian	Old City of Jerusalem	1916
Walid Khalidi	Academia	historian	Jerusalem	1925
Salem Hanna Khamis	Academia	economic statistician	Nazareth	1919
Laila Al-Marayati	Medicine	gynecologist	USA	1962
Khaled Mardam-Bey	Academia	programmer	Jordan	1968
Nur Masalha	Academia	academic, historian, editor	Galilee	1957
Joseph Massad	Academia	academic	Jordan	1963
Basheer Nafi	Academia	academic	Rafah	1952
Ali H. Nayfeh	Academia	mathematician, mechanical engineer, physicist	Tulkarm	1933
Sari Nusseibeh	Academia	philosopher, diplomat	Syria	1949
Edward Said	Academia	professor of comparative literature, intellectual, and Palestinian Nationalist	Jerusalem	1935
Uri Davis	Academia	professor, civil rights activist, politician	Jerusalem	1943
Nadia Abu El Haj	Academia	professor, anthropologist	USA	1962
Albert Aghazarian	Academia	professor, historian, university administrator, politician	Jerusalem	1950
Rosemarie Said Zahlan	Academia	historian	Egypt	1937
Anis Sayigh	Academia	historian	Tiberias	1931
Yezid Sayigh	Academia	historian	USA	1955
Zuhair Al-Karmi	Academia, Natural science	author, scientific programs presenter on TV	Damascus	1922
Omar M. Yaghi	Chemistry	Nobel prize	Amman	1965
Hashem El-Serag	Medicine	doctor and medical researcher	Libya	1966
Reem Kassis	Literature	cookbook author	Jerusalem	1987
Hisham Sharabi	Academia	historian	Jaffa	1927
Qustandi Shomali	Academia	professor, historian, critic, researcher	Beit Sahour	1946
Khalil Suleiman	Medicine	medical doctor	Jenin	1943
Helga Tawil Souri	Academia	professor, media scholar and researcher, filmmaker	Kuwait	1969
Ahmad Teebi	Academia	geneticist and dysmorphologist	Beirut	1949
Aseel Anabtawi	Science	Electrical engineer with NASA	Tulkarem	1969
Ali Abunimah	Literature	author, journalist	USA	1971
Said K. Aburish	Literature	author, journalist	Jerusalem	1935
Susan Abulhawa	Literature	author, journalist	Kuwait	1970
Mourid Barghouti	Literature	poet	Ramallah	1944
Khalil Beidas	Literature	author	Nazareth	1874
Huzama Habayeb	Literature	author	Kuwait	1965
Jamal Dajani	Literature	author, journalist, producer	Jerusalem	1957
Mahmoud Darwish	Literature	poet	Al-Birwa	1941
Khaled Ennasra	poet	journalist	Jenin	1927
Najwa Kawar Farah	Literature	author	Nazareth	1923
Hanna Abu Hanna	Literature	writer and poet	Reineh	1928
Rashida Tlaib	Politician	congresswoman	USA	1976
Emile Habibi	Literature	author	Haifa	1922
Bella Hadid	Fashion	model	USA	1996
Gigi Hadid	Fashion	model	USA	1995
Mohamed Hadid	Business	businessman	Nazareth	1948
Suheir Hammad	Literature	poet	Jordan	1973
Nadia Hijab	Literature	author, journalist	Syria	1950s
Jabra Ibrahim Jabra	Literature	poet, novelist, translator and literary critic	Bethlehem	1919
Emily Jacir	Artist	professor, filmmaker	Bethlehem	1975
Randa Jarrar	Literature	author, translator	USA	1978
Sabri Jiryis	Literature	author	Fassuta	1938
Ghassan Kanafani	Literature	author	Acre	1938
Hasan Karmi	Literature	linguist and author	Tulkarm	1905
Ghada Karmi	Literature	author	Jerusalem	1939
Sayed Kashua	Literature	author and journalist	Tira	1975
Widad Kawar	Literature	author and collector	Tulkarm	1932
Sahar Khalifa	Literature	novelist	Nablus	1942
Daoud Kuttab	Literature	journalist, author	Jerusalem	1955
Taha Muhammad Ali	Literature	poet	Saffuriyya	1931
Salman Masalha	Literature	poet, writer, essayist and translator	Maghar	1953
Kamal Nasser	Literature	poet, activist	Gaza	1924
Mohammed Omer	Literature	journalist	Rafah	1984
Samih al-Qasim	Literature	poet	Jordan	1939
Nahid al-Rayyis	Literature	poet	Gaza	1937
Abu Salma	Literature	poet	Tulkarm	1906
Khalil al-Sakakini	Literature	author	Old City of Jerusalem	1878
Naomi Shihab Nye	Literature	poet	USA	1952
Serene Husseini Shahid	Literature	author, philanthropist, researcher and collector of Palestinian costumes	Jerusalem	1920
Khaled Abu Toameh	Literature	journalist	Tulkarm	1963
Fadwa Tuqan	Literature	poet	Nablus	1917
Ibrahim Touqan	Literature	poet, writer of the poem Mawtini, the current national anthem of Iraq	Nablus	1905
Samir El Youssef	Literature	writer and critic	Lebanon	1965
May Ziadeh	Literature	author	Nazareth	1886
Hanna Batatu	Literature	Historian and Academic	Jerusalem	1926
Mosab Abu Toha	Literature	Poet	Gaza	1992
Mustafa Abu Ali	Film	film director, founder of Palestinian Revolutionary Cinema, eight films	Malha	1940
Hany Abu-Assad	Film	film director	Nazareth	1961
Rashad Abu Sakhila	Film	actor, poet	Jabalia	2001
Kamel El Basha	Film	actor, film director	Malha	1962
Mohammad Bakri	Film	film director, actor	Bi'ina	1953
Cherien Dabis	Film	film director, writer	USA	1976
Qaher Harhash	Film	actor, model	East Jerusalem	1998
Annemarie Jacir	Film	film director, writer	Bethlehem	1974
Michel Khleifi	Film	film director (Wedding in Galilee)	Nazareth	1950
Lexi Alexander	Film	film director	Mannheim	1974
Clara Khoury	Film	actress	Haifa	1976
Makram Khoury	Film	actor, first Arab to win (Israel Prize – 1987)	Jerusalem	1945
Saja Kilani	Film	actress	Jordan	1998
Rashid Masharawi	Film	film director	Gaza	1962
Mai Masri	Film	film director	Beirut	1959
Elia Suleiman	Film	film director (Divine Intervention)	Nazareth	1960
Hiam Abbass	Film	actress	Nazareth	1960
Anwar Jibawi	Film	comedian	USA	1991
Waleed Zuaiter	Film	actor, producer	USA	
Motaz Malhees	Film	actor	Jenin	1992
Nasri Tony Atweh	Music	lead singer of the band MAGIC! & singer/songwriter/record producer	Toronto	1981
Ramzi Aburedwan	Music	composer, viola player	Bethlehem	1979
Charlie Bisharat	Music	Grammy-winning violinist	USA	1963
Yacoub Shaheen	Music	Winner of the fourth season of Arab Idol	Bethlehem	1994
Mohammed Assaf	Music	Winner of the second season of Arab Idol	Gaza	1989
Belly	Music	rapper	Jenin	1984
Rim Banna	Music	singer/songwriter	Nazareth	1966
Ammar Hasan	Music	singer	Salfit	1976
Wissam Joubran	Music	composer and Oud player	Nazareth	1983
Reem Kelani	Music	singer/composer/musicologist	UK	1963
Shadia Mansour	Music	rapper/singer	UK	1980s
Amal Murkus	Music	singer	Galilee	1970s
Nemahsis	Music	singer	Canada	
Mohsen Subhi	Music	composer, arranger, oud and buzuq player	Ramallah	1963
DJ Khaled	Music	hip-hop producer, radio personality, and DJ	USA	1975
Simon Shaheen	Music	oud and violin virtuoso, composer	Galilee	1955
Massiv	Music	rapper	Germany	1982
Tära	Music	singer-songwriter	Italy	2003
Habib Hassan Touma	Music	composer	Nazareth	1934
Fred Wreck	Music	hip-hop producer	USA	1972
Tamer Nafar	Music	rapper of DAM fame	Lod	1979
Bashar Murad	Music	singer, songwriter, visual artist	Jerusalen	1993
Sameh Zakout	Music	rapper	Ramle	1980s
Laila Bagge Wahlgren	Music	manager and songwriter	Sweden	1972
Tarééc	Music	German singer	Germany	1978
Dalal Abu Amneh	Music	singer and producer	Nazareth	1983
DAM (band)	Music	Palestinian rap group	Lod	1970s
Fouad Awad	Art	theater director	Nazareth	1956
Alaa Minawi	Art	multidisciplinary artist, lecturer	Beirut	1982
Naji al-Ali	Art	cartoonist	al-Shajara	1938
Iman Al Sayed	Art	artist	Sharjah	1984
Nasr Abdel Aziz Eleyan	Art	artist	Jericho	1941
Mustafa Al-Hallaj	Art	artist	Jaffa	1938
Mona Hatoum	Art	sculptor	Beirut	1952
Nabil Anani	Art	artist	Halhoul	1943
Hasan Hourani	Art	painter	Hebron	1974
Emily Jacir	Art	painter and photographer, artist	Bethlehem	1970
Hanna Jubran	Art	sculptor	Galilee	1952
Sliman Mansour	Art	painter	Birzeit	1947
Sama Raena Alshaibi	Art	photographer, artist	Iraq	1973
Ahlam Shibli	Art	photographer	Galilee	1970
Jafar Tukan	Art	architect	Jerusalem	1938
Hisham Zreiq	Art	artist and film director (The Sons of Eialboun)	Nazareth	1968
Heba Zagout	Art	painter	Bureij	1984
Rami Kashou	Fashion	fashion designer	Ramallah	1977
Jaffa Phonix (band)	Music	band	Kuwait	1980s
Yousef Beidas	Business	Intra Bank	Jerusalem	1912
Munib al-Masri	Business	PADICO	Nablus	1934
Hasib Sabbagh	Business	Consolidated Contractors International Company	Tiberias	1920
Naim Attallah	Business	Asprey, Quartet Publishing	Haifa	1931
Talal Abu-Ghazaleh	Business		Jaffa	1938
Sam Bahour	Business	West bank businessman	USA	1964
Tarab Abdul Hadi	Politics	activist	Jenin	1910
Fu'ad Nassar	Politics (PCP)	co-founded National Liberation League in Palestine	Nazareth	1914
Nabil Amr	Politics (Fatah)	presidential aide and negotiator		1947
Yasser Arafat	Politics (Fatah)	first President of the PNA	Cairo	1929
Hakam Balawi	Politics (Fatah)	former ambassador of PLO to Tunisia and Algeria	Tulkarm	1939
Marwan Barghouti	Politics (Fatah)	founder of Tanzim and senior Fatah opposition figure	Kobar	1959
Mohammed Dahlan	Politics (Fatah)	Head of Preventive Security Service in Gaza	Gaza	1961
Saeb Erekat	Politics (Fatah)	presidential aide and senior negotiator	Jerusalem	1955
Qadura Fares	Politics (Fatah)	PNA minister and aide of Barghouti		
Rawhi Fattuh	Politics (Fatah)	former interim President of the PNA	Barqa	1949
Faisal Husseini	Politics (Fatah)	former head of Jerusalem affairs	Baghdad	1940
Farouk Kaddoumi	Politics (Fatah)	former head of Fatah	Jinsafut	1931
Salah Khalaf	Politics (Fatah)	former top aide of Arafat	Jaffa	1933
Ahmed Qurei	Politics (Fatah)	former Prime Minister of the Palestinian National Authority	Jerusalem	1937
Ali Hassan Salameh	Politics (PLO)		Qula	1940
Nabil Shaath	Politics (Fatah)	former Foreign Affairs Minister	Safed	1938
Khalil al-Wazir	Politics (PLO)	former PLO military leader and top aide	Ramleh	1934
Mohammad Shtayyeh	Politics/Fatah	economist/academic/minister	Nablus	1958
Muhammad Abu Tir	Politics (Hamas)	Political leader and militant	Umm Tuba	1951
Mohammad Barghouti	Politics (Hamas)			
Mohammed Deif	Politics (Hamas)	Former leader of Qassam Brigades, Hamas' military wing	Khan Younis	1965
Ismail Haniyeh	Politics (Hamas)		Gaza	1963
Mousa Abu Marzook	Politics (Hamas)	Fundraiser for terrorist activities	Rafah	1951
Ahmed al-Ja'abari	Politics (Hamas)		Gaza	1960
Wasfi Kabha	Politics (Hamas)	Prisoners' Affairs Minister		
Khaled Meshaal	Politics (Hamas)	Secretary-General of Hamas	Silwad	1956
Abdel Aziz al-Rantissi	Politics (Hamas)	founder and former Secretary-General of Hamas	Yibna	1947
Ahmed Yassin	Politics (Hamas)	founder and spiritual leader	Al-Jura	1937
Mahmoud al-Zahar	Politics (Hamas)	former Foreign Affairs Minister of the Palestinian National Authority, Hamas foreign minister	Jerusalem	1945
Salah Shehade	Politics (Hamas)	leader of military wing of the Hamas organization	Gaza	1953
Yahya Ayyash	Politics (Hamas)	chief bomb maker planner of the Hadera bus station suicide bombing	Jerusalem	1966
Bassam Abu Sharif	Politics (PFLP)	former spokesperson of PFLP and PLO		1946
George Habash	Politics (PFLP)	founder and former Secretary-General of PFLP	Lod	1926
Abu Ali Mustafa	Politics (PFLP)	former Secretary-General of PFLP	Jenin	1938
Leila Khaled	Politics (PFLP)	former PFLP militant and activist	Haifa	1944
Ahmed Saadat	Politics (PFLP)	current Secretary-General of PFLP	al-Bireh	1953
Nader Sadaqa	Politics (Popular Front for the Liberation of Palestine|PFLP	exiled militant and activist	Mount Gerizim	1977
Riyad al-Malki	Politics (PFLP)	current Foreign Affairs Minister of PNA		1955
Wadie Haddad	Politics (PFLP)	former PFLP militant and founder	Safed	1927
Abu Qatada	Politics	al-Qaeda Muslim religious preacher and militant	Bethlehem	1959
Abu Muthana	Politics	spokesman for the Palestinian Army of Islam		
Haidar Abdel-Shafi	Politics	independent, head of Palestinian delegation to Madrid Peace Conference of 1991	Gaza	1919
Salah Abdel-Shafi	Politics	independent, economist, Palestinian Ambassador to Sweden, Germany, Austria, and UNOV	Gaza	1962
Muhammad Zaidan	Politics	PLF	Syria	1948
Musa Alami	Politics		Jerusalem	1897
Hanan Ashrawi	Politics	Third Way	Nablus	1946
Mustafa Barghouti	Politics	doctor and leader of the Palestinian National Initiative	Jerusalem	1954
Nayef Hawatmeh	Politics	DFLP	Jordan	1935
Ahmed Jibril	Politics	PFLP-GC	Jaffa	1938
Karimeh Abbud	Art	photographer	Shefa 'Amr	1896
Nimr al-Khatib	Politics	political leader, Haifa	Haifa	1918
Jabra Nicola	Politics	Trotskyist leader	Haifa	1912
Abu Nidal	Politics	Abu Nidal Organization	Jaffa	1937
Nahid al-Rayyis	Politics	Justice Minister of the Palestinian National Authority	Gaza	1937
Afif Safieh	Politics	Palestine's Ambassador to the Russian Federation	jerusalem	1950
Hasan Tahboub	Politics	former Head of the Supreme Islamic Council	Hebron	1923
Ruhi al-Khatib	Politics (local)	mayor of East Jerusalem from 1957 to 1994; titular	Jerusalem	1914
Fahmi al-Abboushi	Politics (local)	appointed mayor of Jenin in 1935	Jenin	1895
Hussein Al-Araj	Politics (local)	former mayor of Nablus		
Ramiz Jaraisy	Politics (local)	mayor of Nazareth		1951
Omar Hammayil	Politics (local)	mayor of al-Bireh		1976
Mohammed Milhim	Politics (local)	former mayor of Halhul		1929
Hadem Rida	Politics (local)	mayor of Jenin		
Bassam Shaka	Politics (local)	former mayor of Nablus		1930
Ghassan Shakaa	Politics (local)	former mayor of Nablus		1943
Adly Yaish	Politics (local)	mayor of Nablus		
Adel Zawati	Politics (local)	former mayor of Jenin, Nablus, Hebron, Ruler of Yafa, Ramleh	Nablus	1920
Ahmad Tibi	Politics (Israel)	member of Israeli Knesset from the Ta'al party, former political advisor to Palestinian Authority President Yasser Arafat	Tayibe	1958
Azmi Bishara	Politics (Israel)	former member of Israeli Knesset, from the Balad party	Nazareth	1956
Jamal Zahalka	Politics (Israel)	member of Israeli Knesset, from the Balad party	Kafr Qara	1955
Hana Sweid	Politics (Israel)	member of Israeli Knesset with Hadash and mayor of Eilabun	Eilabun	1955
Tawfiq Ziad	Politics (PCP)	a poet, a former mayor of Nazareth and a former Hadash member of Israeli Knesset	Nazareth	1929
Ibrahim Sarsur	Politics (Israel)	Knesset member Israel from the United Arab List party	Kafr Qara	1959
Taleb el-Sana	Politics (Israel)	Knesset member Israel from the United Arab List party	Tel Arad	1960
Mohammad Barakeh	Politics (Israel)	member of Israeli Knesset, from Hadash party	Shefa-'Amr	1955
Haneen Zoabi	Politics (Israel)	first Arab woman elected to the Knesset on an Arab party	Nazareth	1969
Rania of Jordan	Politics (Foreign)	Queen of Jordan, wife of King Abdullah II	Kuwait	1970
Alia al Hussein	Politics (Foreign)	late Queen of Jordan, 3rd wife of King Hussein	Cairo	1948
Antonio Saca	Politics (Foreign)	former president of El Salvador	El Salvador	1965
Shafik Handal	Politics (Foreign)	El Salvador politician	El Salvador	1930
Nayib Bukele	Politics (Foreign)	president of El Salvador	El Salvador	1981
Carlos Flores Facussé	Politics (Foreign)	former president of Honduras	Honduras	1950
Said Musa	Politics (Foreign)	former Prime Minister of Belize	Belize	1944
Pierre de Bané	Politics (Foreign)	Canadian	Haifa	1938
Naser Khader	Politics (Foreign)	member of the Parliament of Denmark	Syria	1963
Joe Hockey	Politics (Foreign)	Australian cabinet minister	Australia	1965
John H. Sununu	Politics (Foreign)	former Chief of Staff Pres. George H. Bush Administration	Cuba	1939
John E. Sununu	Politics (Foreign)	Senator from New Hampshire	USA	1964
Huwaida Arraf	Politics	co-founder of ISM	USA	1976
Mubarak Awad	Politics	advocate of nonviolent resistance	Jerusalem	1943
Abdullah Yusuf Azzam	Religion (Islam)	Islamist scholar and activist	Jenin	1941
Bulus Farah	Politics	trade unionist	Haifa	1910
Abd al-Qadir al-Husayni	Politics	nationalist leader	Jerusalem	1907
Archbishop Theodosios (Hanna) of Sebastia	Religion (Christianity)	current archbishop of Sebastia for the Greek Orthodox Patriarchate of Jerusalem	Galilee	1965
Riah Abu Assal	Religion (Christianity)	current Anglican Bishop of Jerusalem	Nazareth	1937
Naim Ateek	Religion (Christianity)	founder of Sabeel	Beit She'an	1937
Elias Chacour	Religion (Christianity)	Archbishop of Galilee, of the Melkite Greek Catholic Church	Galilee	1939
Michel Sabah	Religion (Christianity)	current Latin Patriarch of Jerusalem	Nazareth	1933
Munib Younan	Religion (Christianity)	Lutheran bishop	Jerusalem	1950
Rifat Odeh Kassis	Politics	human rights and community activist	Beit Sahour	
Mitri Raheb	Religion (Christianity)	Lutheran minister and author	Bethlehem	1962
Benny Hinn	Religion (Christianity)	evangelical preacher	Jaffa	1952
Anis Shorrosh	Religion (Christianity)	evangelical preacher and debater	Nazareth	1930s
Amin al-Husayni	Politics	former Mufti of Jerusalem	Jerusalem	1895
Ekrima Sa'id Sabri	Religion (Islam)	former Mufti of Jerusalem		
Ahmad Abu Laban	Religion (Islam)	Imam in Denmark	Jaffa	1946
Raed Salah	Religion (Islam)	leader of the Northern branch of the Islamic Movement		1958
Sheikh Taissir Tamimi	Religion (Islam)	Head of Islamic court in Palestinian territories	Hebron	
Omar Sheika	Sport	Professional Boxer	USA	1977
Salim Tuama	Sport	soccer player	Lod	1979
Ramsey Nijem	Sport	MMA fighter, The Ultimate Fighter: Team Lesnar vs. Team dos Santos runner up	USA	1988
Walid Badir	Sport	soccer player, Israeli team, Captain of Hapoel Tel Aviv	Kafr Qasim	1974
Muhammad al-Durrah	Other	12-year-old boy filmed getting shot during the second Intifada by French TV.	Gaza	1988
Faris Odeh	Other	teenage boy shot while throwing stones	Gaza	1985
Rana Raslan	Other	1999 Miss Israel contest winner	Haifa	1977
Mahmoud Abbas	Politics (Fatah)	President of the PNA	Safed	1935
Tawfiq Canaan	Academia	doctor and academic	Beit Jala	1881
Ahmad Shukeiri	Politics (PLO)	first chairman of the PLO	Lebanon	1908
Omar Barghouti	Politics	political activist and analyst PACBI	Qatar	1964
Asma Agbarieh	Politics, journalism	journalist, leader of Organization for Democratic Action	Jaffa	1974
Muin Bseiso	Literature	Poet	Gaza	1926
Eyad al-Sarraj	Medicine	psychiatrist and human rights activist	Beersheba	1944
Fadi Elsalameen	Politics	political commentator and analyst	USA	1983
Layla Moran	Politics	British Liberal Democrat Member of Parliament for Oxford West and Abingdon	UK	1982
Michael Malarkey	Film	actor and musician	Beirut	1983
May Calamawy	Film	actress	Bahrain	1986
Mayssoun Azzam	Media	TV anchor, news presenter, media instructor, and activist		1972
