= List of people from Hebron =

The following is a list of notable people both born in Hebron and otherwise associated with the city.

== People born in Hebron ==
- Hayyim ben Jacob Abulafia (1660–1744), 17th-century renewer of Jewish settlement in Tiberias
- Basel Adra, 21st-century journalist
- Jacob Alyashar (1730–c. 1790), Talmudist and emissary
- Raphael Hayyim Isaac Carregal (1733–1777), rabbi, friend of Yale president Ezra Stiles
- Karam Dana (1979), Palestinian American Distinguished Professor, University of Washington
- Mazen Dana (1962–2003), Palestinian journalist killed by United States soldiers in Baghdad
- Fadi Elsalameen (born 1983), Palestinian activist and blogger
- Hasan Hourani (1974–2003), Palestinian artist
- Muhammad Ali Ja'abari, long-serving mayor of Hebron
- Sulaiman Ja'abari, former Grand Mufti of Jerusalem
- Abraham Konki, 17th-century Hebronite rabbi
- Yitzhaq Shami, Jewish-Israeli writer whose characters were often Arabs or Sephardic Jews

== People associated with Hebron ==
- Eliezer ben-Arhah, rabbi, from about 1615 until his death in 1652
- Chaim Hezekiah Medini, rabbi and author of Sdei Chemed. Buried in Old Jewish cemetery, Hebron
