= Charles H. Mitchell =

American academic administrator and football player (1940–2025)

Charley Mitchell
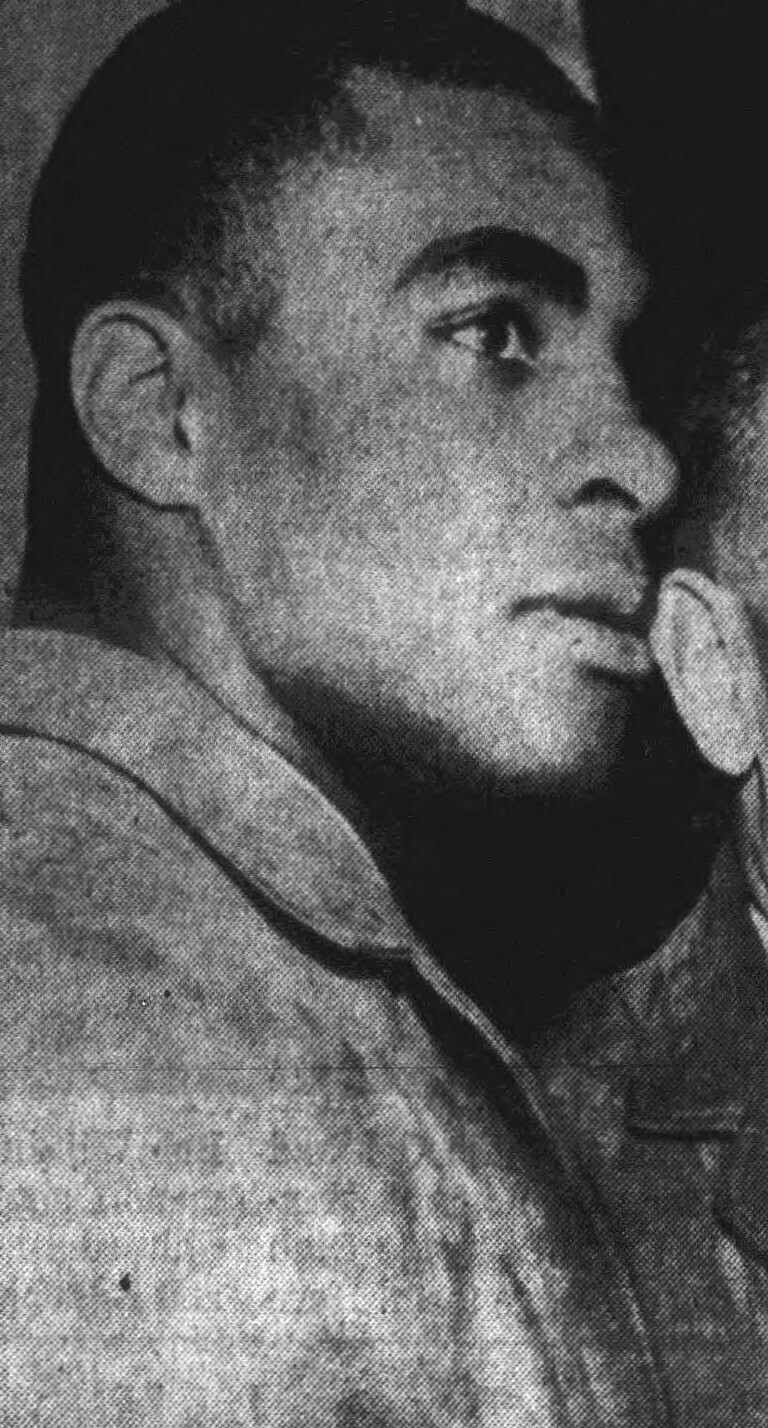
- Mitchell in 1962

No. 27, 46
- Positions: Halfback, Defensive back

Personal information
- Born: May 25, 1940; McNary, Arizona, U.S.
- Died: June 27, 2025 (aged 85); Seattle, Washington, U.S.
- Listed height: 5 ft 11 in (1.80 m)
- Listed weight: 185 lb (84 kg)

Career information
- High school: Garfield (Seattle, Washington)
- College: Washington (1959-1962)
- NFL draft: 1963: 4th round, 52nd overall pick
- AFL draft: 1963: 18th round, 141st overall pick

Career history
- Denver Broncos (1963-1967); Buffalo Bills (1968)

Awards and highlights
- First-team All-PCC (1961); Second-team All-PCC (1962)

Career AFL statistics
- Rushing yards: 1,138
- Rushing average: 3.2
- Receptions: 62
- Receiving yards: 550
- Total touchdowns: 9
- Stats at Pro Football Reference

Charles H. Mitchell (May 25, 1940 – June 27, 2025) was an American academic administrator and professional American football player. He was the president of the Seattle Central Community College from 1987 to 2003 and the chancellor of the Seattle Community Colleges District from 2003 to 2008.

== Education ==
Mitchell attended T.T. Minor Elementary School, Meany Junior High, and Garfield High School. He earned a bachelor's degree from the University of Washington, a master's degree from Seattle University, and a doctorate in education from Brigham Young University.

== Athletics ==
Mitchell played running back for the Washington Huskies football team and was a member of the team that won the 1961 Rose Bowl. He had nine carries for 53 yards as the game's leading rusher with the College All-Stars in its 20–17 upset win over the Green Bay Packers on August 2, 1963. He played professional football for six years with the Denver Broncos and Buffalo Bills.

== Education career ==
Mitchell joined Seattle Central Community College in 1981 as a teacher and later dean of students. He became president of the college in 1987 and held that post until 2003, when he was named the chancellor of the Seattle Community Colleges District.

== Death ==
Mitchell died on June 27, 2025, at the age of 85.
