= Egyptian Theater (Seattle) =

Historic building in the U.S. state of Washington

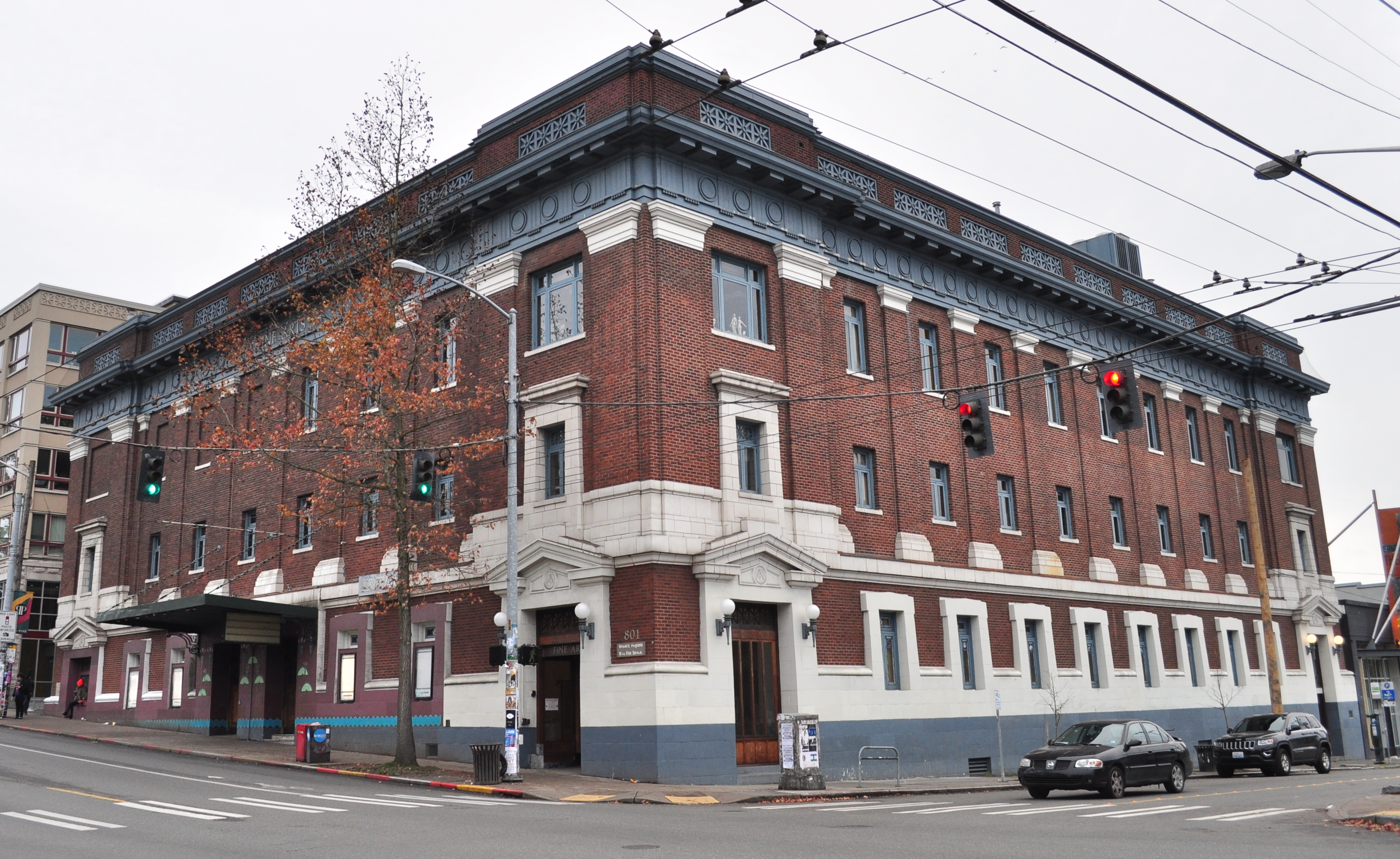
- The building's exterior, 2014
- Alternative names: SIFF Egyptian Cinema

General information
- Type: Movie theater
- Location: 805 East Pine Street; Seattle, Washington, U.S.
- Coordinates: 47°36′54″N 122°19′18″W
- Completed: 1916
- Renovated: 1980, 2014
- Owner: Seattle Colleges

Website
- siff.net

The Egyptian Theater, also known as the SIFF Cinema Egyptian, is a movie theater in the Capitol Hill neighborhood of Seattle, Washington, United States. The theater is located on Pine Street near the Seattle Central College campus. From 2013 to 2024, it was operated by the Seattle International Film Festival (SIFF).

The theater is located in a historic Masonic Temple, which opened in 1916 and served several local lodges. The four-story brick and terra cotta building included a 1,800-seat auditorium designed by B. Marcus Priteca that was used for community events. The auditorium was renovated by SIFF and decorated in an Egyptian theme; it reopened on November 14, 1980, as the 520-seat Egyptian Theater, with a screening of the French film Charles and Lucie. The building was sold to Seattle Central College in 1992 and its theater, which had been acquired by the chain Landmark Theaters.

Landmark continued to operate the Egyptian Theater until June 27, 2013, after the company declined to renew its lease with Seattle Central College. SIFF took over the lease in May 2014 and raised $340,000 from crowdsourced donations to repair and reopen the theater. The SIFF Egyptian Theater reopened on October 3, 2014. The theater returned to the SIFF circuit beginning with the 42nd annual festival in 2016.

The theater closed indefinitely in November 2024 due to water damage following a leak on the fourth floor. Several screenings were moved to other SIFF venues around the city. On October 9th, 2025, SIFF and Seattle Central Colleges announced that SIFF will not continue its lease to manage and operate the Egyptian Theatre due to the high repair costs associated with the water damage and SIFF's financial outlook. The future of the theatre is unclear as Seattle Central Colleges announced they are continuing their focus on how to best use the facilities to best support their students and the college's mission.

In November 2026, a group named WFLM Seattle announced that it would officially open the Egyptian in early December as a weekend cinema.
