= Ahmed Khalidi =

Palestinian politician (born 1945)

Ahmed Mubarak Al-Khalidi

Minister of Justice
- In office 29 March 2006 – 17 March 2007
- Prime Minister: Ismail Haniyeh
- Preceded by: Farid al-Jallad
- Succeeded by: Ali al-Sartawi

Personal details
- Born: 1945 (age 80–81) Jerusalem, Palestine
- Party: Independent
- Education: Ph.D. in Public Law, Political Systems and Constitutional Law from Cairo University, Cairo (Egypt)
- Occupation: Professor of law, dean of the College of Law, lawyer

Ahmed Mubarak Al-Khalidi (Arabic: أحمد مبارك الخالدي; born 1945 in Jerusalem) is a Palestinian politician, lawyer, university professor, and university faculty member. He served as the Minister of Justice of the Palestinian National Authority from 29 March 2006 to 17 March 2007 after Hamas won the elections and took clear control of the Palestinian Legislative Council. Al-Khalidi is a former professor of law and dean of the College of Law at An-Najah National University in Nablus, in the West Bank. For several years, he has been instrumental in drafting a permanent Palestinian Constitution. He holds a Ph.D. in Public Law, Political Systems and Constitutional Law from Cairo University, Cairo (Egypt) that was granted in 1979.

Political offices
Preceded by Farid al-Jallad	Minister of Justice; 2006–2007	Succeeded by Ali al-Sartawi
