= Ministry of Justice (Palestine) =

Government ministry of Palestine

- وزارة العدل
- Seal of Palestine

Agency overview
- Formed: 1948 (first form); 1994 (second form)
- Jurisdiction: Government of Palestine
- Headquarters: Ramallah, Palestine
- Minister responsible: Sharhabil al-Za'im, Minister of Justice
- Website: www.moj.pna.ps

The Ministry of Justice of Palestine (Arabic: وزارة العدل) was established in 1994 after the partial lifting of the Israeli occupation in certain areas and the establishment of the Palestinian National Authority. The ministry aims to meet societal needs by establishing the rules of justice, equality and order.

== List of ministers ==
All-Palestine Government

#	Minister	Party	Government	Term start	Term end	Notes
1	Ali Al-Hassan	Independent	All-Palestine	22 September 1948	1949	

Government of Palestine

#	Minister	Party	Government	Term start	Term end	Notes
1	Fareeh Abu Madin	Fatah	1, 2, 3	5 July 1994	13 June 2002	
2	Ibrahim al-Daghmeh	Fatah	4	13 June 2002	29 October 2002	
3	Zuhair Sourani	Fatah	5	29 October 2002	30 April 2003	
4	Abdel Karim Abu Salah	Fatah	6	30 April 2003	7 October 2003	
5	Jawad al-Tibi	Fatah	7	7 October 2003	12 November 2003	
6	Nahid al-Rayyis	Fatah	8	12 November 2003	24 February 2005	
7	Farid al-Jallad	Independent	9	24 February 2005	29 March 2006	
8	Ahmed Khalidi	Hamas	10	29 March 2006	17 March 2007	
9	Ali al-Sartawi	Hamas	11	17 March 2007	14 June 2007	
10	Ali Khashan	Independent	12, 13	14 June 2007	16 May 2012	
11	Ali Muhanna	Fatah	14, 15, 16	16 May 2012	2 June 2014	
12	Salim al-Sakka	Independent	17	2 June 2014	14 December 2015	
13	Ali Abu Diak	Independent	17	14 December 2015	13 April 2019	
14	Mohammad Fahhad Al-Shalaldeh	Independent	18	13 April 2019	31 March 2024	
15	Sharhabil al-Za'im	Independent	19	31 March 2024	Incumbent	

== See also ==
- Justice ministry
- Politics of Palestine
