= Seattle Central College =

Public college in Seattle, Washington, US

Coordinates: 47°37′00″N 122°19′18″W

- Former names: • Edison Technical School (1930–1966) • Seattle Community College (1966–1970) • Seattle Central Community College (1970–2014)
- Type: Public college
- Established: 1965
- Endowment: $5,127,981
- President: Chantae Recasner (interim)
- Students: 16,814
- Location: Seattle, Washington, U.S.
- Campus: Urban, 15 acres
- Language: English
- Website: seattlecentral.edu

Seattle Central College is a public college in Seattle, Washington, United States. With North Seattle College and South Seattle College, it is one of the three colleges that comprise the Seattle Colleges District. The college has a substantial international student population served by the International Education Programs division as well as many immigrant and refugee students taking ESL courses through the Basic and Transitional Studies division. Seattle Central College also encompasses the Wood Construction Center and Seattle Maritime Academy, which are on separate campuses.

== History ==
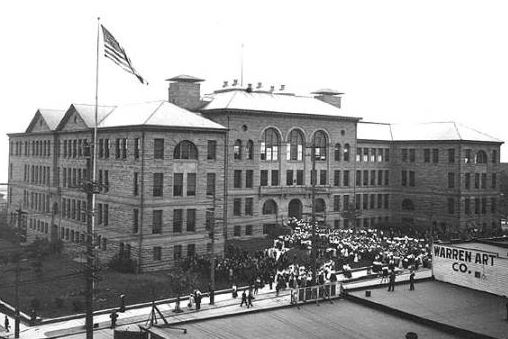
Broadway High School pictured in 1909. Much of the former school's main building was demolished in the 1970s; a portion was rebuilt as Seattle Central College's Broadway Performance Hall.

Seattle Central's origins can be traced to 1902, with the opening of Broadway High School. It operated as a traditional high school. In 1930, the Edison Technical School was founded by the district and later shared the campus with Broadway. At the end of World War II, the entire campus was converted to a vocational and adult education institution for the benefit of veterans who wanted to finish high school. As a result, in 1946, its high school students were all transferred to Lincoln High School, and Edison expanded to fill the entire facility.

Edison started offering college-level courses when it was reconstituted as Seattle Community College in September 1966. North Seattle Community College and South Seattle Community College opened their doors in 1970, whereupon Seattle Community College was renamed Seattle Central Community College.

In March 2014, the Seattle Community Colleges District Board of Trustees voted unanimously to change the name of the District to Seattle Colleges and to change the names of the colleges to Seattle Central College, North Seattle College and South Seattle College. The decision followed similar decisions by nine other Washington state community colleges that had recently started to offer baccalaureate degrees.

In 2021, the Intiman Theatre became the theater-in-residence. The organization previously rented a facility at the Seattle Center.

== Campus ==
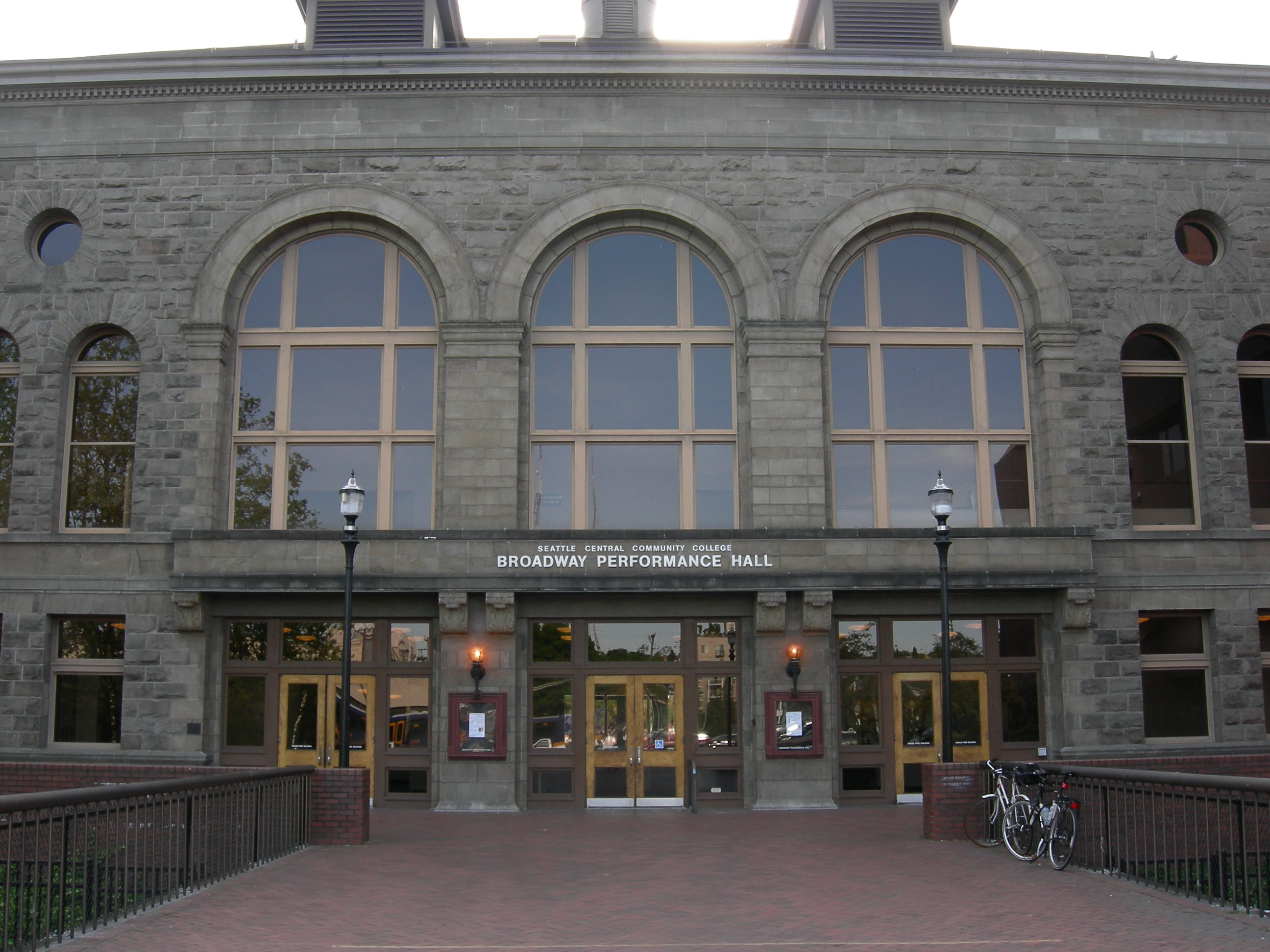
Seattle Central College's Broadway Performance Hall

Seattle Central College is an urban campus on Seattle's Capitol Hill, located along its main thoroughfare, Broadway, and west of Cal Anderson Park. The college occupies 10 buildings. Its main structure is the five-story Broadway-Edison Building, which stands south of the four-story Science and Math Building. West of the Broadway-Edison building stand the four-story Mitchell Activity Center, a bookstore, and on-campus apartments for international students; south stand the three-story Broadway Performance Hall, the South Plaza, and the five-story Fine Arts Building. Other structures in the southern part of the campus include a three-story South Annex, Erickson Theater, and Siegal Center (the Seattle Colleges District headquarters). There is also a four-story parking garage just west of the Broadway Performance Hall.

In addition to its campus, the college owns the Egyptian Theater and several parcels between Pine and Pike streets. The Egyptian Theater.

== Academics and programs ==
=== Academic degrees ===
Seattle Central College offers two accredited bachelor's degree programs, a Bachelor of Applied Science in Applied Behavioral Science, and a Bachelor of Applied Science in Allied Health. The applied nature of the degrees places increased emphasis on teaching practical skills, versus theory. In addition, two-year associate's degrees are offered that comply with Washington's Direct Transfer Agreement (DTA). The DTA guarantees that all credits taken will be accepted for transfer to any state university in Washington for completion of a bachelor's degree at that institution for persons wanting to pursue a B.A. or B.S. outside of Seattle Central.

=== Basic studies ===
Seattle Central's Basic Studies Division offers ESL training to non-native speakers to achieve English proficiency, as well as a GED preparation and testing program.

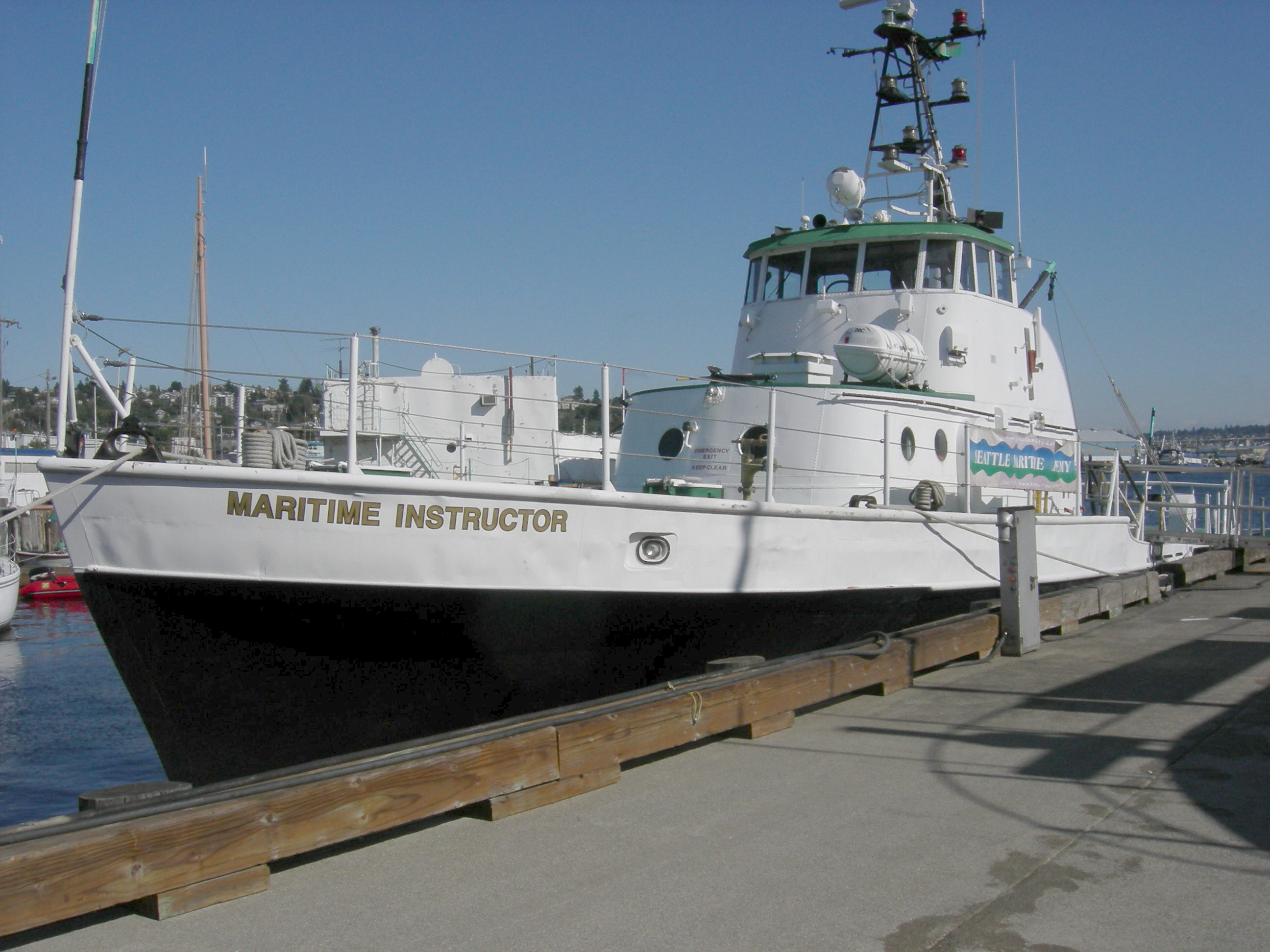
The Seattle Maritime Academy operated ship "Maritime Instructor"

=== Vocational training ===
Seattle Central College's Seattle Maritime Academy provides students aspiring to enter the U.S. Merchant Marine with STCW training, through two different programs, each requiring about one year to complete. The Marine Deck Technology program teaches skills designed to prepare students to qualify for an Able Seaman–Special rating, while the Marine Engineering Technology program prepares students to qualify as a marine electrician or junior engineer. Both programs culminate in a 60-day at-sea internship aboard a large commercial ship. The academy operates its own 82-foot vessel, Maritime Instructor (formerly USCGC Point Divide), for instructional purposes.

The college's Seattle Culinary Academy offers a five quarter certificate program in Specialty Desserts and Breads, and a six quarter certificate program in Culinary Arts. Both are accredited by the American Culinary Federation.

Seattle Central's Wood Technology Center offers three certificate programs (carpentry, cabinet making, and marine carpentry) ranging in length from four to six quarters.

Other vocational training offered by Seattle Central includes information technology and graphic design programs. A two-year Associate of Science in Nursing is offered to prepare students to become registered nurses.

== Student life ==
=== Mitchell Activity Center ===
The Mitchell Activity Center is an 85,000 square feet (7,900 m^{2}) athletic facility constructed in 1996. It includes racquetball and squash courts, gymnasiums, a strength training facility, and a game room.

=== Student publications ===
The City Collegian was Seattle Central College's award-winning biweekly student newspaper, published continuously from 1966 until 2008. In that year, college administrators shut it down and cancelled journalism classes after controversial articles by student journalists embarrassed the administrators, prompted student protests, and incurred administrative hostility toward the journalists and their publication. The paper's faculty adviser, Jeb Wyman, resigned to protest administrative actions. The City Collegian returned to print as New City Collegian on June 5, 2012. Written by Seattle Central students, the publication was sponsored by a local business, Cupcake Royale, and received no funding from the college. It has since ceased publication. A magazine, The Central Circuit, was established in 2011 and published several times a year. It was the only student publication funded by the college until it suspended publication in 2016 due to the lack of an advisor.

Since 2018, Seattle Central College's newspaper has continued in the form of The Seattle Collegian.

== Notable alumni and faculty ==
=== Alumni ===
- Bruce Lee – martial artist and Hollywood action film star
- Josh Homme – founder, guitarist with Queens of the Stone Age
- Karam Dana – Palestinian American distinguished professor
- James DeMile – martial artist
- Ayşenur Eygi – activist killed in the West Bank
- Duff McKagan – bassist with Guns N' Roses
- Dean Fujioka – Japanese actor, musician, model, director, artist, and radio host
- Macklemore (took Running Start classes as a high school student) – musician
- Tay Zonday – singer, actor, musician, voice talent
- DeCharlene Williams – business owner and activist

=== Faculty and staff ===
- Constance Rice (former) – University of Washington Board of Regents member, wife of former Seattle mayor Norm Rice
- Kshama Sawant (former) – Seattle City Council member
