= Mohammad Fahhad Al-Shalaldeh =

Palestinian politician, academic and economist

- وزارة العدل (فلسطين)

Minister of Justice
- In office 13 April 2019 – 31 March 2024
- President: Mahmoud Abbas
- Prime Minister: Mohammad Shtayyeh
- Preceded by: Ali Abu Diak
- Succeeded by: Sharhabil al-Za'im

Personal details
- Born: 3 February 1955 (age 71) Sa'ir, Hebron Governorate, Palestine
- Party: Fatah
- Education: Azerbaijan State University of Economics

Mohammad Fahhad Al-Shalaldeh (born 3 February 1955 in Sa'ir) is a Palestinian politician, jurist and academic. He served as Minister of Justice from 13 April 2019 to 31 March 2024 within the government of Mohammad Shtayyeh.

== Education ==
Al-Shalalda obtained a high school diploma from Hebron city schools in 1974. He obtained a master's degree in law from the Faculty of International Law at Azerbaijan State University of Economics in the Azerbaijani capital, Baku, in 1983. He also obtained a doctorate in international law from the same university in 1987.

== Career ==
After graduating in 1988, Al-Shalalda worked as a regular lawyer until 2019.

He served as Dean of Al-Rahma College for Girls in the city of Hebron from 1990 to 1995, where he was a lecturer and head of the Social Sciences Department. He then worked as academic vice dean of the Palestine Technical College for Girls in the city of Ramallah from 1995 to 1996.

He worked as a lecturer at several universities: Al-Quds University, Palestine Polytechnic University, Al-Quds Open University, and Al-Istiqlal University. He was Dean of the Faculty of Law at Al-Quds University from 2005 to 2011, and Dean of the College of Law and Police Sciences at Al-Istiqlal University from 2011 to 2013.

He served as Director of the Palestinian Institute for International Humanitarian Law and Human Rights from 2004 to 2019. He was appointed Minister of Justice in the government of Mohammad Shtayyeh from 13 April 2019 to 31 March 2024. As Minister of Justice, on 31 July 2019, he became a member of the Supreme Coordination Council for the Justice Sector, and on 16 August 2023, he continued to serve as a member of the council after the council was amended.

== Writings ==
International Humanitarian Law Book 2017.

Political offices
Preceded by Ali Abu Diak	Minister of Justice; 2019–2024	Succeeded by Sharhabil al-Za'im
