= Fatima al-Budeiri =

Palestinian radio broadcaster (1923–2009)

Fatima al-Budairi
- فاطمة البديري
- Al-Budeiri in the late 1940s
- Born: Fatima Musa al-Budeiri; 1923; Jerusalem, Mandatory Palestine
- Died: June 2009 (aged 85–86); Amman, Jordan
- Resting place: Amman, Jordan
- Education: Teachers' College, Jerusalem
- Occupations: Radio broadcaster; librarian
- Years active: 1946–1983
- Employers: Jerusalem Calling (1946–1948); UNRWA (1965–1971); University of Jordan (1978–1983)
- Spouse: Issam Hammad (m. 1948; died 2006)
- Children: 2

Fatima Musa al-Budeiri (or al-Budairi; Arabic: فاطمة موسى البديري; 1923 – June 2009) was a Palestinian radio broadcaster and library curator. She began her radio career at the radio station Jerusalem Calling broadcasting and producing and working as a women's and literary programme assistant and news broadcaster. Al-Budeiri also worked in Germany, Syria and Jordan, where she was a librarian for the United Nations Relief and Works Agency for Palestine Refugees in the Near East and the Jordan University Library. She received recognition from the Arab Women Journalists Center.

== Early life and education ==
Al-Budeiri was born in Jerusalem in 1923, to an ancient family tracing back its roots in the city itself. She was the daughter of the Sharia judge Sheikh Musa al-Budeiri, who worked in Jerusalem, and transferred his knowledge to students at the Al-Aqsa Mosque. Al-Budeiri was educated at the Teachers' College, Jerusalem, from which she graduated in 1941. She first educated in the city of Bethlehem, and then went on to teach at the Rural Teachers' House in Ramallah.

== Career ==
In early 1946, Al-Budeiri joined the staff of the radio station Jerusalem Calling as a broadcaster and producer. Her father did not raise any objections to her career choice. Al-Budeiri worked as an assistant for the women's and literary programmes as well as broadcasting the news. She left the broadcaster in 1947. In 1949, Al-Budeiri relocated to Damascus, Syria, and co-founded Radio Al-Sham ("Radio Syria") with her husband. She moved back to Ramallah in 1952, and was asked to broadcast the news on a daily basis on a radio station whilst also working in the education field. Al-Budeiri subsequently relocated to East Berlin in 1957, broadcasting the news on Radio Berlin Arab on East German Radio for the following seven years.

She returned to Ramallah in 1965 and then relocated to Amman, Jordan, two years later. Al-Budeiri served as curator of the library at the United Nations Relief and Works Agency for Palestine Refugees in the Near East between 1965 and 1971 and later for the classification department at the Jordan University Library from 1978 to 1983. She partook in several Arab and international conferences with her professional experiences subjected to multiple studies and was researched for the purposes of the role of Arab women in the media.

== Personal life ==
Al-Budeiri was married to the Palestinian poet, radio broadcaster and writer Issam Hammad from 1948 to his death in 2006. Their marriage produced two children. In early July 2009, she died in Amman. Although Al-Budeiri dreamed of a burial in Jerusalem, she was instead buried in Amman.

== Legacy ==
The obituarist for Al Ra'i described her as a "wonderful Jerusalemite lady". Writer Aida Najjar said Al-Budeiri had made herself to be "a broadcaster for political news to be the leader among women, and in this work and to work with men". Ad-Dustour noted she was a "pioneer of Arab radio stations, and the only female voice that competed with men's voices on the radio." Al-Budeiri was given recognition by the Arab Women Journalists Center.
