= Ali al-Sartawi =

Palestinian professor and politician

Minister of Justice
- In office 17 March 2007 – 14 June 2007
- President: Mahmoud Abbas
- Prime Minister: Ismail Haniyeh
- Preceded by: Ahmed Khalidi
- Succeeded by: Ali Khashan

Personal details
- Born: 1967 (age 58–59) Sarta, Palestine
- Children: 5
- Education: University of Jordan; An-Najah National University
- Occupation: Professor, politician
- Profession: Law

Dr. Ali al-Sartawi (Arabic: علي سرطاوي; born 1967 in Sarta) is a Palestinian professor and politician. He served as Minister of Justice in the national unity government of the Palestinian National Authority from 17 March 2007 to 14 June 2007. From 2006 to 2007, he was the Dean of the Faculty of Law at An-Najah National University. Since 1999, he has been a professor of law at An-Najah National University in Nablus, Palestine. Sartawi is married and has five children.

== Notes ==
Political offices
Preceded by Ahmed Khalidi	Minister of Justice; 2006–2007	Succeeded by Ali Khashan
