= Aida González =

Panamanian writer and medical doctor (born 1962)

Aída Judith González Castrellón
- Education: University of Panama
- Occupations: doctor, writer

Aída Judith González Castrellón (born December 4, 1962) is a Panamanian writer and medical doctor. She studied medicine at the University of Panama.

Gonzalez has published different stories in the magazine Maga, such as Pájaro Sin Alas (Birds Without Wings), Espejismos (Mirages).

== Awards and nominations ==
Year	Award	Result
1997	Finalist in the short story Maga	Nominated
1999	Winner of National Short Story "José María Sánchez	Won
