= Farah Baker =

Palestinian tweeter

Farah Baker is a Palestinian social media activist living in the Gaza Strip, who became popular while live-Tweeting the 2014 Israel–Gaza conflict. At the age of 16, she tweeted her thoughts and feelings as bombing raids occurred at her home. Her Tweets became a social network phenomenon, and Baker's following on Twitter jumped from 800 to 166,000 in a few days. In Anna Reading's book, Gender and Memory in the Globital Age she writes that Baker was covered in news articles in The Daily Telegraph in the UK and Russia Today.

== See also ==
- Rula Hassanein
