= Bandali al-Jawzi =

Russian and Soviet historian and linguist

Bandali Saliba al-Jawzi
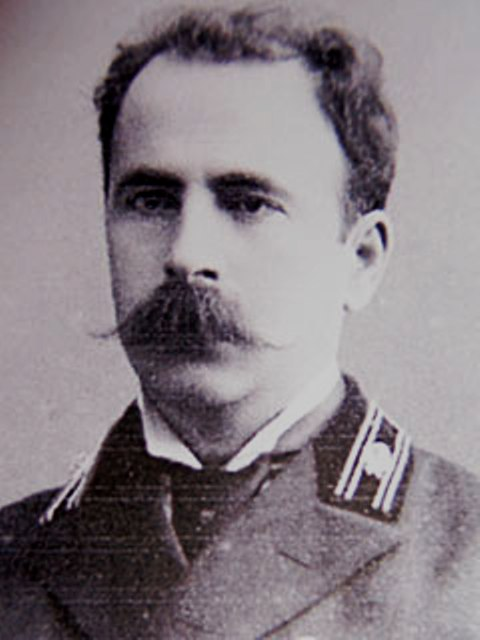
- Citizenship: Russian
- Occupation: Linguistics

Bandali Saliba al-Jawzi (1871–1943) is a Russian Orientalist of Palestinian origin, a linguistic researcher, a reference and a prominent figure in Orientalism and Semitic languages.

== Biography ==
Bandali Saliba al-Jawzi was born in a Christian family in Jerusalem in 1871.He had three sisters and two brothers.
