= Aida Tağızada =

Azerbaijani musicologist (1934–2025)

- Born: 5 February 1934; Shusha, Azerbaijan
- Died: 6 August 2025 (aged 91); Baku, Azerbaijan
- Other name: Aida Zeynal qızı Tağızadə
- Occupations: academic and musicologist
- Known for: worked at the Baku Musical Academy (BMA) from 1958
- Notable work: XX Century Azerbaijani Music

Aida Zeynal qızı Tağızadə (5 February 1934 – 6 August 2025) was an Azerbaijani academic and musicologist.

== Life and career ==
Tağızadə was born in Shusha on 5 February 1934. She worked at the Baku Musical Academy (BMA) from 1958. She published a number of books related to the music of Azerbaijan, including a collection titled XX Century Azerbaijani Music.

Tağızada died in Baku on 6 August 2025, at the age of 91.
