= Aida Reyna =

Peruvian volleyball player (born 1950)

Personal information
- Full name: Aída Reyna Flores
- Born: 9 September 1950 (age 76); San Vicente de Cañete, Peru
- Height: 1.74 m (5 ft 9 in)

Volleyball information
- Position: Outside hitter
- Number: 7

Aida Reyna (born 9 September 1950) is a Peruvian former volleyball player. She competed in the women's tournament at the 1968 Summer Olympics.
