= North Seattle College =

Public college in Seattle, Washington, US

Coordinates: 47°41′57″N 122°20′00″W

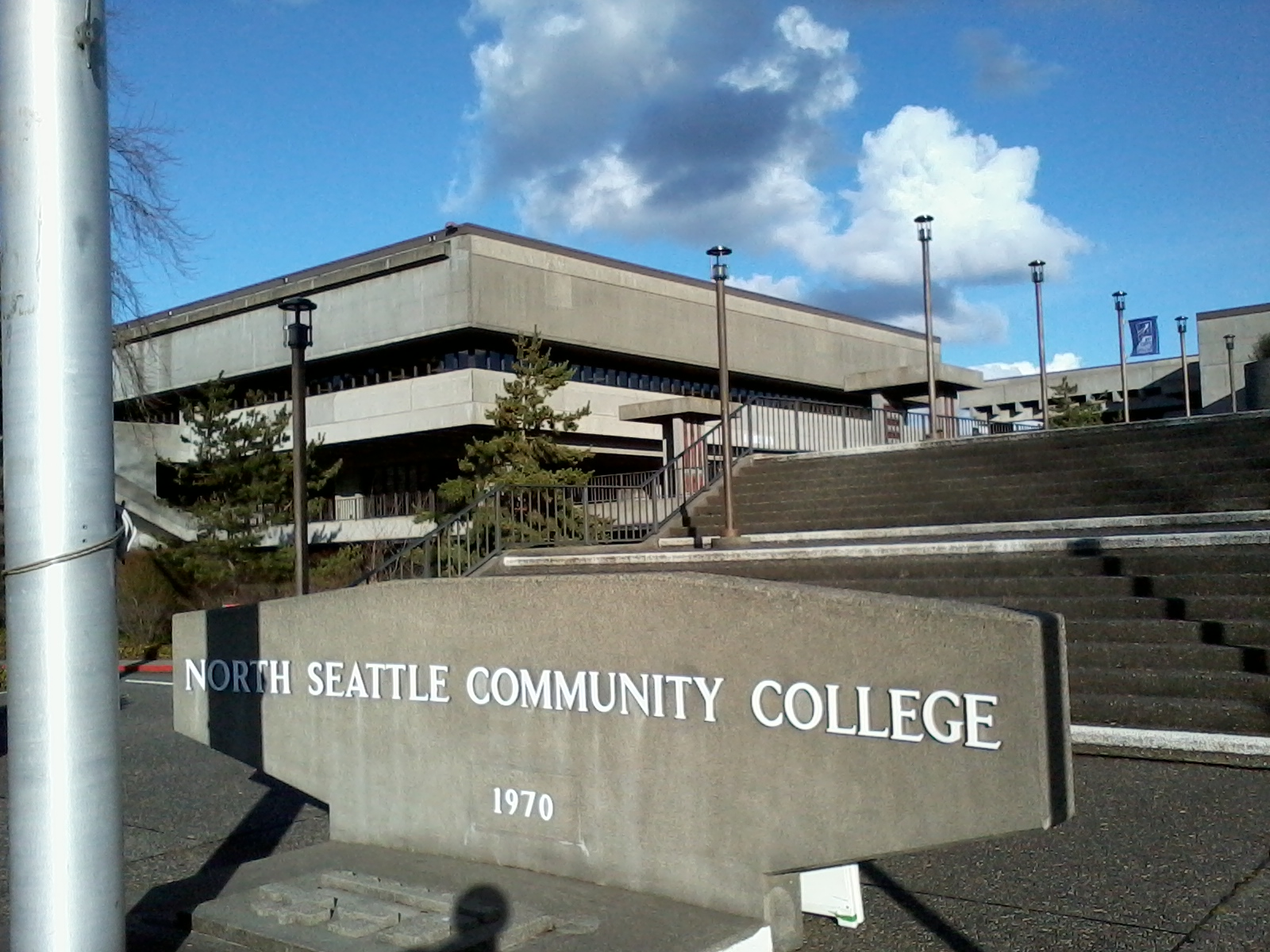
- View from southwest in February 2013
- Former name: North Seattle Community College (1970–2014)
- Type: Public college
- Established: 1970; 56 years ago
- Parent institution: Seattle Colleges District and Washington Community and Technical Colleges
- Accreditation: NWCCU
- President: Rachel Solemsaas
- Faculty: 318
- Administrative staff: 174
- Students: 17,994
- Location: Seattle, Washington, U.S.
- Campus: urban
- Mascot: Star the Pacific Tree Frog
- Website: northseattle.edu

Location in the United States

North Seattle College (NSC or North Seattle) is a public college in Seattle, Washington, United States. It is one of three colleges comprising the Seattle Colleges District and part of the Washington Community and Technical Colleges system.

Founded 56 years ago in 1970, NSC is accredited by the Northwest Commission on Colleges and Universities, and offers associate degrees, bachelor's degrees, university transfer, and certificate programs, as well as continuing education and college preparation programs.

In March 2014, the board of trustees of the Seattle Community Colleges District voted unanimously to change the name of the district to "Seattle Colleges" and North Seattle Community College became North Seattle College.

== Academics ==
NSC programs include academic degrees, college prep and transfer, cross-disciplinary, continuing and senior adult education programs. NSC is also home to the Watch Technology Institute, the only two-year program in the art of Swiss watchmaking and technology in the western United States. NSC also provides Running Start, where high school juniors and seniors can take college classes to earn high school credits as well as college credits.

Since 2010, as part of a new Washington State educational initiative, North Seattle College began offering Bachelor of Applied Science (BAS) degree programs to students that have previously completed a two-year degree.

== Campus ==
The North Seattle College main campus occupies 62 acres (25 ha), including eleven acres (4.5 ha) of environmentally sensitive wetlands, in the Licton Springs/North College Park neighborhood of the Northgate district of Seattle. Located at 9600 College Way North, the campus is five miles (8 km) north of the city center and is easily accessed from Interstate 5, several King County Metro bus routes, and Northgate Station of the Link 1 Line via a dedicated pedestrian bridge over I-5.

NSC campus consists of various academic, athletics & supporting facilities:

- The college's library was founded in 1970; as of 2017, it contains over 174,000 volumes (books, media, serials) in the physical and digital collection, along with 40 plus databases that provide access to many thousands of scholarly, popular, trade, and newspaper articles.
- The Computer Lab facilities & laboratories
- North Seattle Indoor Arena, Physical Education, gymnasium, fitness & wellness center
- NSC Bookstore
- NSC Art Gallery

=== Wetlands ===
The North Seattle College Wetlands sit at the South Fork of Thornton Creek and are important ecological lands for the Thornton Creek watershed as they work as a sponge to hold surge flows of water as well as filtering out pollutants. The wetlands serve as a critical habitat for many species including the Pacific Tree Frog and Long-toed salamander, as well as several species of avian and plant life.

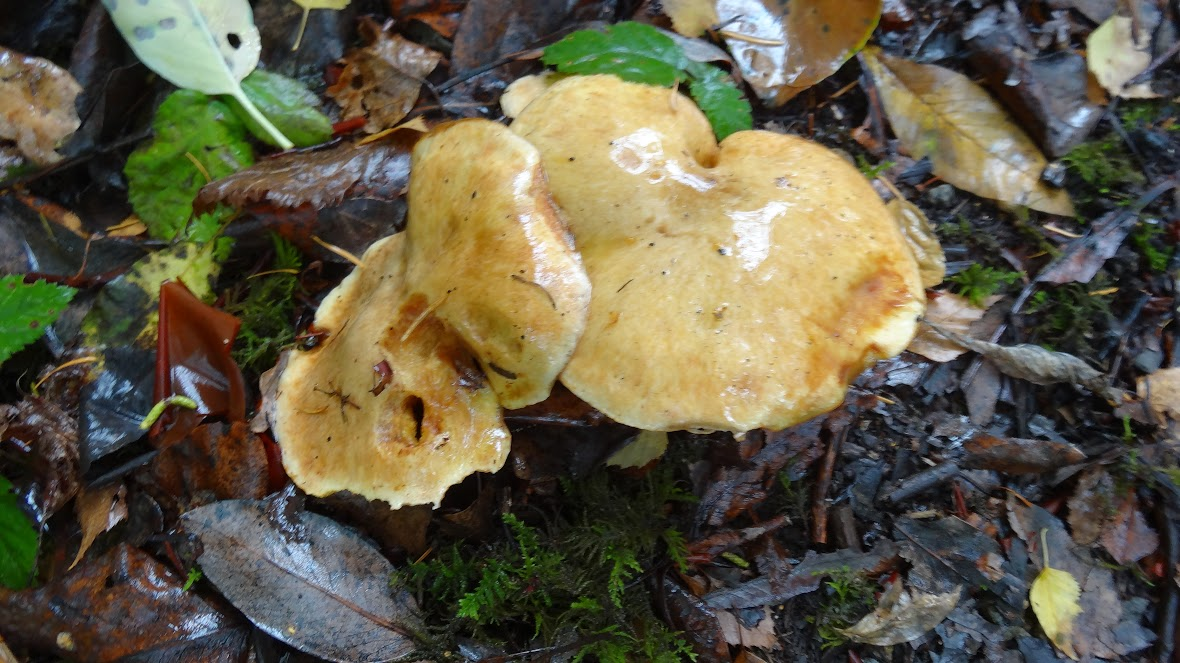
Bellybutton Hedgehog Mushroom (Hydnum Umbilicatum), North Seattle College

Currently, there is a system of crude trails that get you to and through most of the wetlands habitat. The main trail is a loop that walks around the northern part of campus. There are spurs that branch off of this main loop trail. An interpretive trail is in progress and a map is available with points of interest for those wishing to explore the wetlands further.

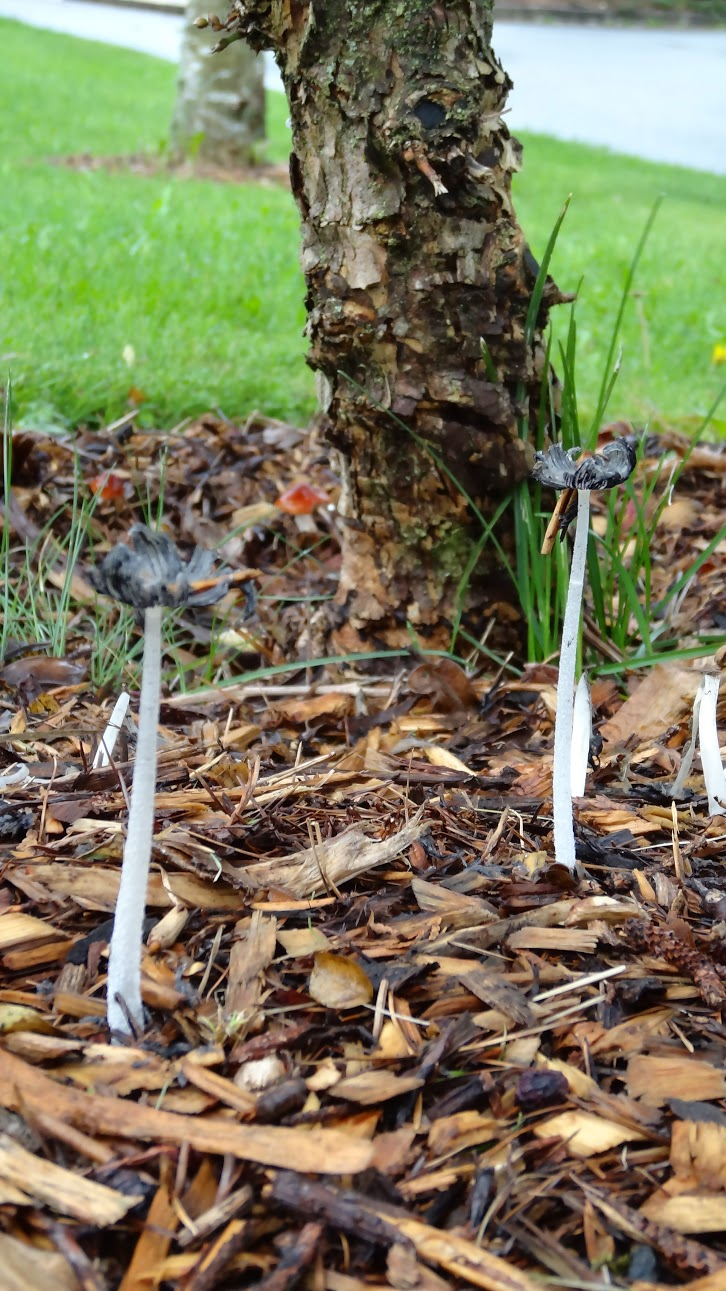
Harefoot Mushroom (Coprinopsis lagopus), North Seattle College

A wide variety of native and non-native plant species can be observed throughout the main campus and surrounding wetlands habitat. There are many mushrooms growing in and around the wetlands. Some notable species include Redlead Roundhead (Stropharia aurantiaca), Harefoot Mushroom (Coprinopsis lagopus), Fiber Caps (Inocybe mixtilis), Shaggy Parasol (Chlorophyllum olvieri), and Bellybutton Hedgehog (Hydnum umbilicatum).

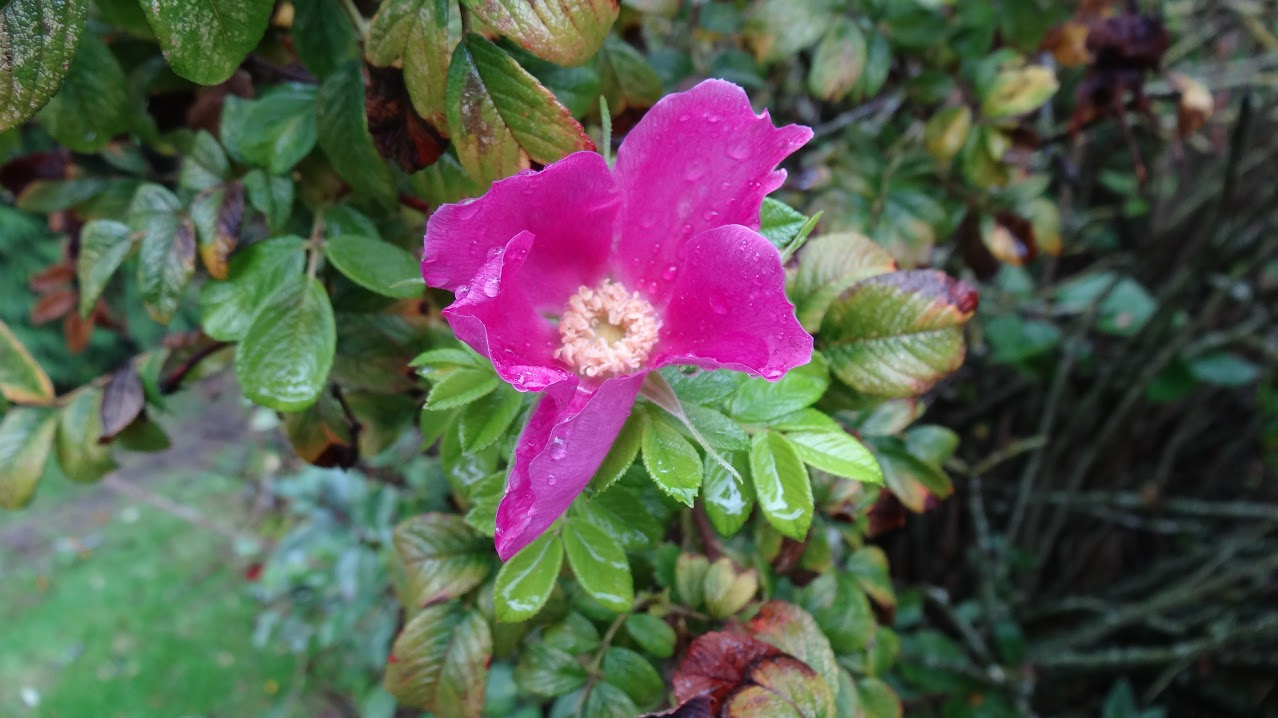
Nootka Rose (Rosa Nutkana), North Seattle College

Wetlands shrub life includes Snowberry Shrubs (Symphoricarpos albus), Himalayan Blackberry (Rubus discolor), Burning Bush (Eunonymus alatus), and Nootka Rose (Rosa Nutkana). Campus and wetlands are also home to many plants such as Sumac (Rhus Species), Yarrow (Achillea millefolium), Sword Fern (Polystichum munitum), and Common Horsetail (Equisetum arvense).

== See also ==
- Thornton Creek
- Licton Springs
