= Aida Woolf =

British dress designer and businesswoman

Aida Woolf (1886–1967) was a British dress designer and businesswoman.

== Early life ==
Aida Woolf was born in Bow, London in 1886, the eldest of seven children of Emmanuel Woolf, a commercial traveller, and Sarah Woolf, a schoolteacher. In 1895, the family moved to Clapham, and stayed there until 1913.

== Career ==
By 1923, Woolf had moved her dressmaking business to 283 Oxford Street, above the ABC Teashop.

In 1928, Woolf moved to new premises in Harewood Place, and in 1936 to 20 Grosvenor Street.

As a West End couturier, Woolf rivalled Reville and Rossiter.

== Personal life ==
In 1914, she married Sydney Benjamin at the Central Synagogue, Great Portland Street.

== Legacy ==
Two of her wedding dresses, from 1914 and 1923 are in the permanent collection of the V&A, including one made for Flora Diamond's wedding to Philip Jacobs at the Bayswater Synagogue in June 1923.
