= Mayssoun Azzam =

Palestinian journalist

Mayssoun Azzam (Arabic: ميسون عزام) (born 1973) is a Palestinian TV anchor, news presenter, media instructor, member of the College of Media & Mass Communication Advisory Board at the American University in the Emirates (AUE) and humanitarian activist.

With over 20 years of experience working in new journalism and mass media education, she has received multiple industry awards for her work.

== Early life ==
Azzam was born in Abu Dhabi, UAE to a Palestinian family. Her parents, Nawaf Azzam and Isaaf El-Youssef, fled Palestine to Lebanon in 1948.

Her father graduated from the Beirut Arab University with a law degree. Unable to practice law due to labor regulations in Lebanon that restricted Palestinians from most white-collar professions, he instead found employment as a school administrator at the Ain al-Hilweh Palestinian refugee camp in Sidon before moving his family to the Gulf region.

Mayssoun grew up in Abu Dhabi where she attended the Rosary School. She later earned her bachelor's degree in Communication Arts with an emphasis in Journalism from the Lebanese American University. Her master's degree was earned at the University of London, Birkbeck, where she majored in Global Politics.

== Career ==
Mayssoun began her career as a reporter for Emirates News & Abu Dhabi TV and radio, UAE where she worked from 1995 – 1997.

Mayssoun has covered major national events and has hosted live radio broadcasts.

Mayssoun conducted high-profile interviews and represented the channel at international forums. Her work included in-depth field reporting from refugee camps in Jordan, Yemen, and conflict zones in Palestine. Later, she was a reporter for Arab News Network in London from 1997 until 2000, and a business presenter for Al Jazeera — London, from 2000 until 2002, creating international current affairs programming and hosting 'Between the Lines'.

She has interviewed notable figures, including Palestinian President Mahmoud Abbas, Saudi State Minister for Foreign Affairs Adel al-Jubair, The UAE State Minister for Foreign Affairs Anwar Gergash, former UK Prime Minister Tony Blair, and Microsoft founder Bill Gates.

She produced eleven episodes about the obstacles facing pregnant women at work. She broke the classic image of Arab news presenters and shared the ups and downs she went through as a working pregnant presenter.

Mayssoun has worked as a senior news anchor on the Al Arabiya News Channel in Dubai. During her working experience in Al Arabiya, Mayssoun anchored for three years a two-hours, weekly talk show, Mashahed wa Ara’ (مشاهد وآراء). Mayssoun also wrote political and social articles that were published on AlArabiya.net website.

Mayssoun has worked on a weekly program titled "Khat al Mowajaha" (The Frontline), which revisits incidents that marked pivotal moments in history.

=== Academic career ===
Mayssoun has taught multi-platform storytelling, media, culture & society, and advanced reporting courses as an instructor at Mohammed Bin Rashid School for communication, in the American University in Dubai. She designed and delivered course materials combining academic frameworks with her real-world journalism insights.

She has served in an advisory capacity as a board member for the College of Media & Mass Communication, and American University in the Emirates.

== Other work ==
Mayssoun was chosen as the first media advocate for "Josour" a regional initiative launched by UNESCWA during the 1st Arab Forum, aiming to reduce inequalities in the Arab region by creating employment and training opportunities for young people, a humanitarian initiative focused on refugee support through responsible giving.

Mayssoun participated, often as the MC, in key regional and global platforms including DAVOS, the Government Summit, Arab Media Summit, and EXPO 2020.

== Select awards and honors ==
- Excellence Award in Media – Arab Women’s Festival (2025)
- Atwar Bahjat Award – Outstanding Media and Humanitarian Work (2024)
