= Karam Dana =

Palestinian American academic

- كرم دعنا
- Born: Hebron, Palestinian Territories
- Title: Alyson McGregor Distinguished Professor of Excellence and Transformative Research

Academic work
- Discipline: Middle Eastern and Islamic studies
- Institutions: University of Washington Bothell

Dr. Karam Dana (Arabic: كرم دعنا) is a Palestinian American academic. He is the Alyson McGregor Distinguished Professor of Excellence and Transformative Research at the University of Washington Bothell, first named-professorship to ever be established at the institution. He is Professor of Middle Eastern and Islamic Studies, and the founding director of the American Muslim Research Institute (AMRI). Dana served as the co-chair of the University of Washington's Task Force on Islamophobia in 2024.

== Biography ==
He was born and raised in Hebron, West Bank, Palestine. He migrated to the U.S. in the late 1990s. He studied at Seattle Central Community College before transferring to the University of Washington. He holds a Bachelor of Arts degree with a double major in Economics and Political Science. He received a Master of Arts in International Studies from the Jackson School of International Studies. After receiving his PhD from the University of Washington in 2009, he completed a post-doctoral fellowship at the Center for Middle Eastern Studies at Harvard University, then worked as a Research Fellow at the Belfer Center for Science and International Affairs at Harvard Kennedy School of Government. He also taught courses at Harvard University and Tufts University before joining the University of Washington faculty.

== Scholarship ==
Dana is one of the earliest scholars to study Islam and Muslims in the US through public opinion and through the lens of Race, Ethnicity, and Politics (REP) within the discipline of political science. He served as the co-PI of the Muslim American Public Opinion Survey (MAPOS), one of the earliest national surveys of American Muslims. He also studies the question of Palestine, the impact of Israeli occupation on Palestinian society, and Palestinian transnationalism. He has published on American Muslim political behavior, identity politics, and on the question of Palestine. He has lectured widely, and made media appearances, locally, nationally, and around the world. His book, To Stand With Palestine: Transnational Resistance and Political Evolution in the United States, is published by Columbia University Press, and discusses the changing discourse on Palestine in the U.S.

== Awards and recognition ==
- 2018 Distinguished Teaching Award, University of Washington
- 2023 Distinguished Research, Scholarship, and Creative Activities Award, University of Washington
- 2024 Outstanding Service and Leadership Award, Arab American Community of the Pacific Northwest

== Publications ==
=== Articles ===
- Dana, Karam; Barreto, Matt A.; Oskooii, Kassra A.R. (September 27, 2011). "Mosques as American Institutions: Mosque Attendance, Religiosity and Integration into the Political System among American Muslims". Religions. 2 (4): 504–524. doi:10.3390/rel2040504. ISSN 2077-1444.
- Dana, Karam; Wilcox-Archuleta, Bryan; Barreto, Matt (September 2017). "The Political Incorporation of Muslims in the United States: The Mobilizing Role of Religiosity in Islam". Journal of Race, Ethnicity, and Politics. 2 (2): 170–200. doi:10.1017/rep.2017.4. ISSN 2056-6085. S2CID 158141967.
- Dana, Karam (October 2, 2017). "The West Bank Apartheid/Separation Wall: Space, Punishment and the Disruption of Social Continuity". Geopolitics. 22 (4): 887–910. doi:10.1080/14650045.2016.1275576. ISSN 1465-0045. S2CID 152056248.
- Dana, Karam (October 2, 2018). "Confronting injustice beyond borders: Palestinian identity and nonviolent resistance". Politics, Groups, and Identities. 6 (4): 529–552. doi:10.1080/21565503.2016.1229625. ISSN 2156-5503. S2CID 151863044.
- Dana, Karam; Lajevardi, Nazita; Oskooii, Kassra A. R.; Walker, Hannah L. (December 2019). "Veiled Politics: Experiences with Discrimination among Muslim Americans". Politics and Religion. 12 (4): 629–677. doi:10.1017/S1755048318000287. ISSN 1755-0483.
- Oskooii, Kassra A. R.; Dana, Karam; Barreto, Matthew A. (May 27, 2021). "Beyond generalized ethnocentrism: Islam-specific beliefs and prejudice toward Muslim Americans". Politics, Groups, and Identities. 9 (3): 538–565. doi:10.1080/21565503.2019.1623053. ISSN 2156-5503.

=== Books ===
- To Stand with Palestine: Transnational Resistance and Political Evolution in the United States. Columbia University Press. February 2025. ISBN 978-0-231-54652-2.
