= Aida Lafuente =

Spanish politician (1915–1934)

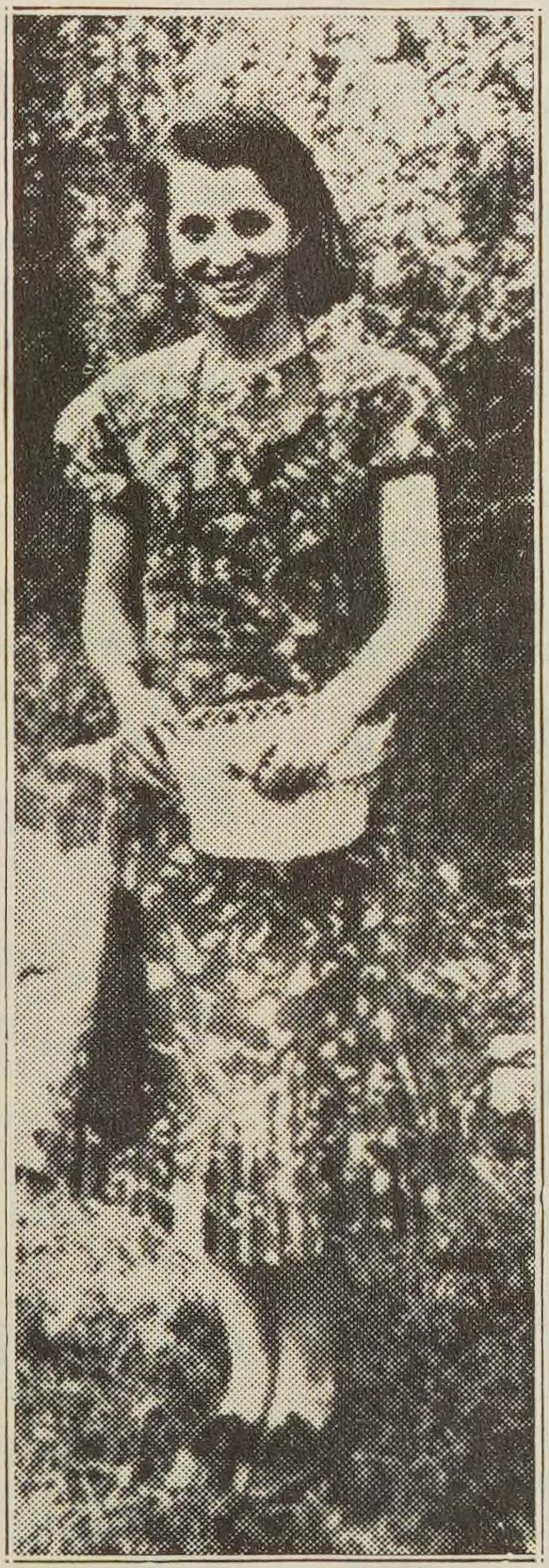
- Born: Aida de la Fuente Penaos; 25 February 1915; León, Spain
- Died: 13 October 1934 (aged 19); Oviedo, Spain
- Political party: Communist Party of Spain
- Parents: Gustavo de la Fuente (father); Jesusa Penaos (mother)

Aida de la Fuente Penaos (25 February 1915 in León – 13 October 1934 in Oviedo), better known as Aida Lafuente, was a Spanish communist militant who died in the Revolution of 1934 in Asturias after the repression by the Second Spanish Republic.

== Biography ==
Aida de la Fuente was born on 25 February 1915 in León, she was the daughter of Gustavo de la Fuente and Jesusa Penaos. Her father was a painter of posters and sets for the Campoamor Theater in Oviedo in Asturias, and had been a founder of the Communist Party of Spain in Oviedo. Aida, along with her brothers, was an active participant in the organization of the Communist Youth of Spain.

== Asturian revolution ==
On October 13, 1934, Aida Lafuente served as a liaison between Oviedo's Revolutionary Committee and rebel groups controlling the western part of the city during the Spanish Republic army's efforts to suppress the 1934 Revolution. Lafuente was killed near the church of San Pedro de los Arcos in Oviedo while attempting, nearly alone, to halt the advance of troops under Lieutenant Colonel Juan Yagüe.

These forces, consisting of Legionnaires, Moroccan Regulares, and artillery units under General Francisco Franco's broader command, faced resistance from two machine gun nests, one of which was operated by Lafuente herself. Though her position was eventually surrounded and overwhelmed by cavalry and infantry attacks, she refused to surrender and stopped their advance for hours, eventually firing her pistol at a legionnaire when ordered to surrender after running out of ammo. Her body was later discovered in a mass grave near the church.

== Legacy ==
After the outbreak of the Civil War, Aida Lafuente's name appeared on propaganda posters. In October 1936, the 1st Asturian Battalion was renamed in honor of Lafuente, and a street with her name appeared in Gijón. A memorial commemorating Aida can be found in Oviedo.

== Family ==
Alejandro Medushevsky (born 1969), the great-nephew of Lafuente, led a pro-Russian militia during the Annexation of Crimea by the Russian Federation in 2014.

== Bibliography ==
- Rodríguez Campesino, Aida (2018). "De guerrera a víctima. Aida de la Fuente: historia de un mito revolucionario". Autoridad, poder e influencia: mujeres que hacen historia. Vol. 2. ISBN 978-84-9888-793-8.
