= Aida Badić =

Croatian artistic gymnast

- Full name: Aida Badić
- Born: February 11, 1986 (age 40) Zagreb, Yugoslavia
- Height: 171 cm (5 ft 7 in)

Gymnastics career
- Discipline: Women's artistic gymnastics
- Country represented: Croatia
- Club: ZTD Hrvatski Sokol
- Head coaches: Bojan Šinkovec, Ana Sesvečan
- Former coach: Gordan Polan
- Music: Hungarian Dance, J. Brahms
- Retired: 2004

Aida Badić (born February 11, 1986, in Zagreb, Yugoslavia), is a Croatian former artistic gymnast. She engaged in gymnastics at the age of 7, in 1992, starting as a member of ZTD Hrvatski sokol - Zagreb. During her career she produced notable results at the national and international level.

== Early life and gymnastics career ==
Aida was a national all-around champion from 1995 to 2003. Her international career began in 1996, when she competed at the Snowflake Gymnastics Cup in New York City, where she placed fifth in the all-around and third on floor, which was a big success back then. Aida's good results continued with forthcoming competitions such as International Tournament "Stjepan Boltižar" where she won a number of medals from 1997 to 2003.

In 1999, she took part in the strong and well-known Austrian International Competition "Alpen-Adria Cup" in Klagenfurt, where she won third place in the all-around competition reaching a score of 33.500 (Old FIG-Code).

Later on, in 2000, she won a silver medal at the Belgian Cup, held in Malmedy, scoring 35.315. As well as the previous competition in Slovenia, this tournament was only a check for the European Championships, going to be held that year in Paris, France. There, she placed 55th (out of 114 gymnasts) with the result of 1386.

== Injuries, recovery and further competitions ==
Later that year, she suffered a back injury and had to withdraw from the "Stjepan Boltižar" tournament. Not quite recovered, in 2001, Badić became a senior gymnast and a national champion as well. However, at the competition held in Luxembourg at the end of that year, after a great start on the vault, she sustained a knee injury and had to withdraw from the competition again. 2002 was the year of recovery for Aida.

Rehabilitation, therapies and various treatments haven't stopped her from being a candidate for the European Championships in Patras, Greece. However, she wasn't fully recovered and her doctor, as well as her coach Bojan Šinkovec, advised her to postpone her comeback for a few more months. Despite those injuries, she managed to do her routines on the floor and bars at the National Competition and win bars and get a silver medal on floor. Also, she placed second at the all-around national competition in November 2002. That was her additional motivation to keep training although her knee was heavily bandaged at every competition. Badić placed second on floor at the "Stjepan Boltižar" Tournament in 2002, right behind her younger teammate Tina Erceg. She continued with training in 2003, won silver on floor and bronze on bars at the Nationals, but was forced to retire at the end of 2004, having finished her 12-year-long career, being a national team member (1997–2004), with over 100 medals, won nationally and internationally.

== Besides gymnastics ==
Moreover, she didn't quit with her involvement in sport. Soon she started attending different coaching and judging courses and now serves as a national judge and coach in Gymnastics Club Samobor. During her career, she finished her elementary and high school education with excellent grades. As of 2005, she has been studying Kinesiology at the University of Zagreb and will soon graduate. As a student, Aida participated in competitions at the university level, competed in high jump for women and won gold. She also took part in scientific research (alongside her university professor and co-operates), regarding the field of education in gymnastics (balance beam and vault), which was published in 2010.

She was also a dance choreographer at the Tala Dance Center, coaching acrobatics as a part of training session for advanced Tala dancers. Aida has been dancing in Tala since 2004. In 2010, Badić was a member of the dance team that accompanied four famous Croatian singers'/entertainers' (Tony Cetinski, Colonia, Luka Bulić and Franka Batelić) tour called "Topstars".

Badić's role models have always been gymnasts. She especially admires famous Romanian gymnasts Nadia Comăneci and Andreea Răducan, as well as American - Shannon Miller or Russian - Svetlana Khorkina.
