= Nahid al-Rayyis =

Palestinian politician

- ناهض الريس

Minister of Justice
- In office 12 November 2003 – 24 February 2005
- President: Yasser Arafat; Rawhi Fattouh (acting); Mahmoud Abbas
- Prime Minister: Ahmed Qurei
- Preceded by: Jawad al-Tibi
- Succeeded by: Farid al-Jallad

First Deputy Speaker of the Palestinian Legislative Council
- In office 7 March 1996 – ?
- Preceded by: Office established
- Succeeded by: ?

Member of the Palestinian Legislative Council
- In office 7 March 1996 – 18 February 2006

Personal details
- Born: Nahid Munir al-Rayyis; 14 October 1937 Gaza City, Palestine
- Died: 13 April 2010 (aged 72) Gaza City, Palestine
- Party: Fatah
- Children: 7
- Education: Cairo University
- Profession: Politician, philanthropist, author, poet
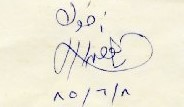
- Signature

Nahid Munir al-Rayyis (Arabic: ‌ناهض الريس, 14 October 1937 – 13 April 2010) was a Palestinian politician, philanthropist, author and poet. He served as first deputy speaker of the Palestinian Legislative Council and as the minister of justice of the Palestinian National Authority.

== Biography ==
Al-Rayyis was born in Gaza City, British Mandate Palestine in 1937. He moved to Egypt in 1954 and graduated from Cairo University with a Bachelor of Laws in 1958.

Afterward, al-Rayyis joined the Palestine Liberation Organization's armed wing and became a leader of the group in Beirut, Lebanon. Along with hundreds of other PLO leaders, he was exiled from Lebanon to Tunisia following the Lebanese Civil War. He returned to Gaza in 1996 and was appointed Deputy Speaker of the Palestinian Legislative Council representing Gaza City under the leadership of Palestinian President Yasser Arafat and as an adviser of the Palestinian Supreme Court. In January 1997, he was appointed to Fatah's second highest-ranking governing body, the Revolutionary Council.

Al-Rayyis served as the Justice Minister of the Palestinian National Authority's emergency government in November 2003. However, he resigned in 2004 citing new laws passed making it difficult for him and his ministry to operate as well as the increased presence of foreign interests (according to him, this included Israel, the United States, and the European Union).

In addition to politics, he was a well-known poet. Most of his work revolved around the Palestinian political struggle and Palestinian culture. He wrote several songs about Palestinian cities and authored the book Palestine in the Critical Period.

After being hospitalized for deteriorating health, al-Rayyis died in Gaza on April 13, 2010. Following his death, dignitaries from every Palestinian faction (including both Fatah and Hamas—which has de facto control over the Gaza Strip) and some parliamentary blocs extended condolences to al-Rayyis's family.

== Bibliography ==
- Parsons, Nigel Craig (2005). The politics of the Palestinian Authority: from Oslo to al-Aqsa. Routledge Publishing. ISBN 0-415-94440-6.

Political offices
| New office | First Deputy Speaker of the Palestinian Legislative Council; 1996–? | Succeeded by – |
| Preceded by Jawad al-Tibi | Minister of Justice; 2003–2005 | Succeeded by Farid al-Jallad |
