= Eliezer ben-Arhah =

Rabbi in Hebron (1615–1652)

Eliezer ben Isaac ben-Arhah אליעזר בן יצחק בן-ארחה

Personal life
- Died: 1652 Hebron, Damascus Eyalet; Ottoman Empire
- Known for: Responsa
- Occupation: Rabbi

Religious life
- Religion: Judaism

Eliezer ben Isaac ben-Arhah (Hebrew: אליעזר בן יצחק בן-ארחה) was a rabbi in Hebron from about 1615 until his death in 1652. He also resided for some time in Safed and Gaza. His responsa, containing questions from all over Palestine and beyond, demonstrate the wide acceptance of his authority. They also reveal much detail about the lives of the Jews living in the Land of Israel at the time. In 1978 they were published.
