= Aida El-Khadra =

Particle physicist

Aida Xenia El-Khadra
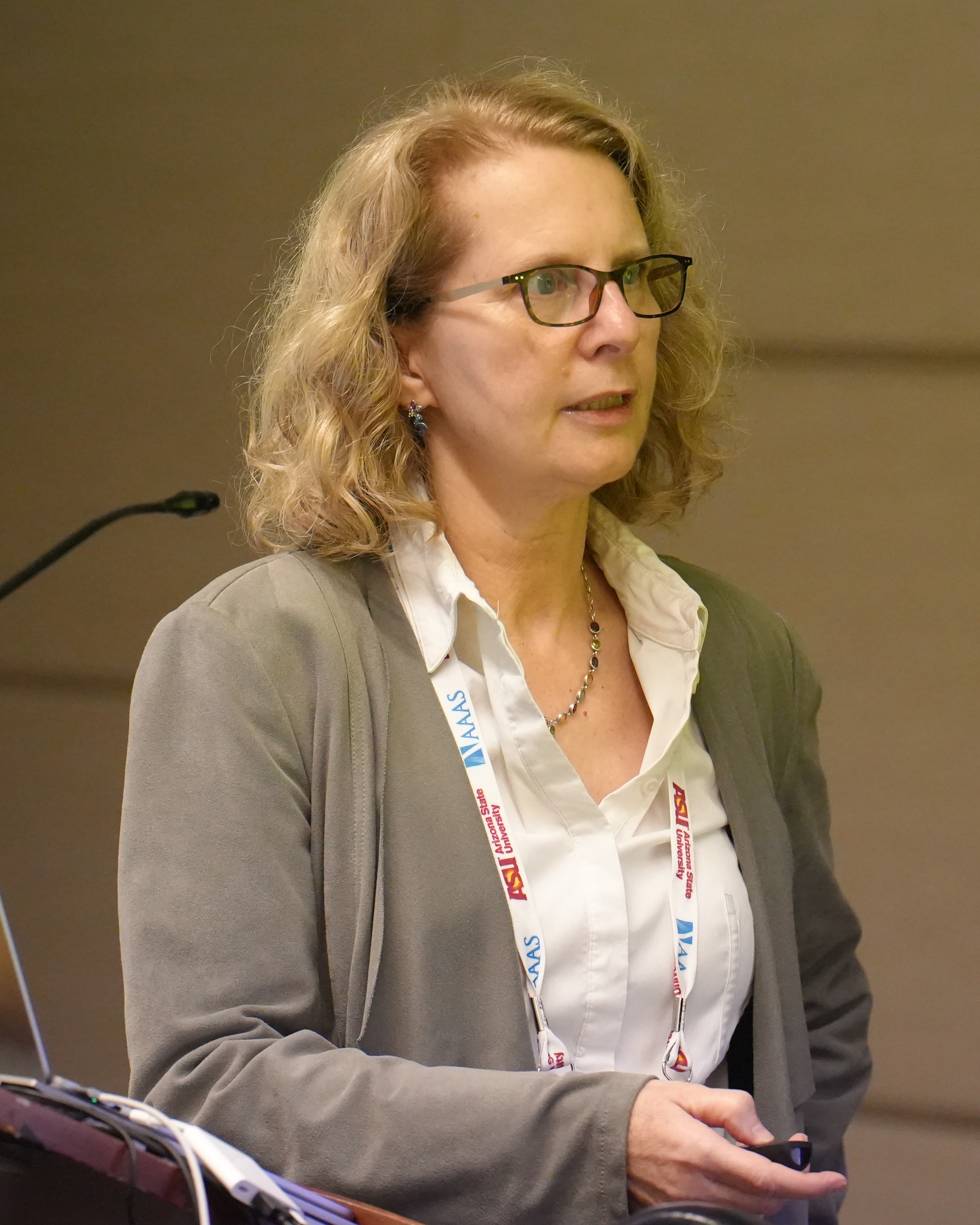
- El-Khadra in 2026
- Education: University of California, Los Angeles; Free University of Berlin
- Scientific career
- Workplaces: Brookhaven National Laboratory; Fermi National Accelerator Laboratory; Ohio State University; University of Illinois at Urbana–Champaign
- Thesis: Lattice calculation of meson form factors for semi-leptonic decays (1989)

Aida Xenia El-Khadra is a particle physicist who is a professor of high energy physics at the University of Illinois at Urbana–Champaign. She is the co-chair of the Muon g-2 Theory Initiative, which reported hints at new physics in the Standard Model in 2021. She is a fellow of the American Physical Society and the Alfred P. Sloan Foundation.

== Early life and education ==
El-Khadra was an undergraduate student at the Free University of Berlin, where she earned a master's degree in physics. She moved to the University of California, Los Angeles for her doctoral research, where she studied semi-leptonic decays. El-Khadra was a postdoctoral researcher at the Brookhaven National Laboratory, Fermilab, and the Ohio State University.

== Research and Pathways ==
In 1995, El-Khadra joined the faculty at the University of Illinois at Urbana–Champaign, where she was promoted to professor in 2008. Her research makes use of quantum chromodynamics to understand processes in flavor physics. She spent 1998 as a Fellow at the Center for Advanced Study, where she developed and tested new lattice actions. El-Khadra directs the Fermilab Lattice collaboration and was named a distinguished scholar at Fermilab in 2016.

El-Khadra oversaw the theoretical aspects of the Muon g-2 experiments. The collaboration measured the magnetic moment of the muon with unparalleled precision. El-Khadra has been involved with several theoretical attempts to predict the anomalous magnetic moment based on the Standard Model. In 2021, the experimental component of the collaboration reported a magnetic moment that was considerably larger than the value predicted by the Standard Model. These finding hints at new particles or forces in the Standard Model.

== Achievements ==
El-Khadra was elected fellow of the American Physical Society in 2011 "for contributions to lattice QCD and flavor physics including pioneering studies of heavy quarks on the lattice, semi-leptonic and leptonic heavy-light meson decays, the strong coupling constant, and quark masses". She was named to the 2021 class of fellows of the American Association for the Advancement of Science. In 2022 she was awarded a Simons Fellowship.

== Selected publications ==
- FLAG Working Group; S Aoki; Y Aoki; et al. (2014). "Review of lattice results concerning low-energy particle physics". European Physical Journal C. 74 (9): 2890. arXiv:1011.4408. doi:10.1140/epjc/s10052-014-2890-7. PMC 4410391. PMID 25972762. Wikidata Q42587418.
- El-Khadra AX; Hockney G; Kronfeld, Andreas; Mackenzie PB (1992). "Determination of the strong coupling constant from the charmonium spectrum". Physical Review Letters. 69 (5): 729–732. doi:10.1103/physrevlett.69.729. PMID 10047018. Wikidata Q64936405.
- Claude W. Bernard; Aida X. El-Khadra; Amarjit Soni (1992). "Lattice study of semileptonic decays of charm mesons into vector mesons". Physical Review D. 45 (3): 869–874. Bibcode:1992PhRvD..45..869B. doi:10.1103/physrevd.45.869. PMID 10014446. Wikidata Q74419228.
