= Khaled Ennasra =

Palestinian poet

- خالد نصرة
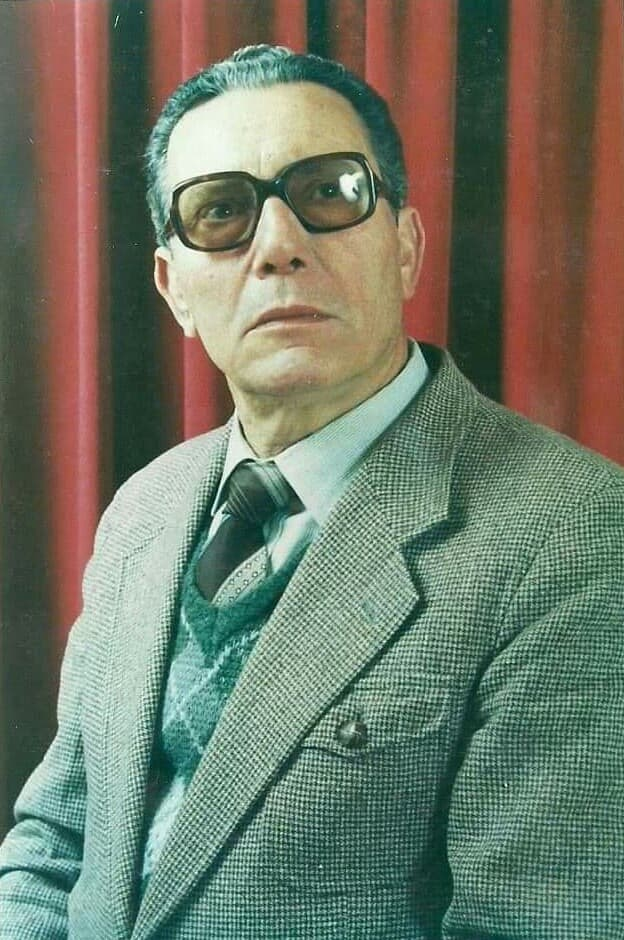
- Born: 1924; Jenin, Mandatory Palestine
- Died: July 14, 2007 (aged 82–83)
- Occupations: Poet, writer

Khaled Ennasra (Arabic: خالد نصرة) (also spelled Nasra, Ennsra, Alnassra, Anassra, and Elnassra; 1924 – 14 July 2007) was a Palestinian poet and writer. He served as a cultural editor at the Al-Quds and An-Nahar newspapers in Jerusalem.

Ennasra was born in Jenin, Mandatory Palestine in 1924. He died on 14 July 2007, at the age of 83.

Nasra's poetry included:

- أغاني الفجر [Songs of the Dawn] (1956)
- لظى وعبير [Blaze and Scent] (1960)
- هزيهم وتسابيح [Hazim and Hymns] (1968)
- لمن الخيول [To Whom The Horses Belong] (1978)
- شواطئ الضباب [Fog Beaches] (1990)
- القنديل الوهاج [The Incandescent Lamp] (1995)
- أحلى الأناشيد [Sweeter Anthems] (1997)
- قلادة المجد [The Necklace of Glory] (1998)
