= Seattle Colleges District =

Group of colleges in Seattle, Washington, U.S.

Coordinates: 47°36′52″N 122°19′18″W

- Former name: Seattle Community Colleges District
- Type: Public
- Established: 1970
- Affiliations: League for Innovation in the Community College - Board Member College; Washington Community and Technical Colleges
- Chancellor: Rosie Rimando-Chareunsap
- Academic staff: 1,080 (2023-24)
- Students: 32,800 (2023-24)
- Location: Seattle, Washington, U.S.
- Campus: Urban
- Website: seattlecolleges.edu

The Seattle Colleges District (previously Seattle Community Colleges District; also known simply as Seattle Colleges) is a group of public colleges in Seattle, Washington. It nowadays consists of three colleges—North Seattle College, Seattle Central College, and South Seattle College. Together the colleges form the second largest institution of higher education in the state, behind the University of Washington, to which many of their graduates transfer.

The district's origins can be traced to 1902, with the opening of Broadway High School on Capitol Hill. It operated as a traditional high school until the end of World War II, when it was converted to a vocational and adult education institution for the benefit of veterans who wanted to finish high school but no longer fit in at regular schools. As a result, in 1946, Broadway High School was renamed Edison Technical School. Edison started offering college-level courses 21 years later, and it was reconstituted as Seattle Community College in September 1966.

North Seattle Community College and South Seattle Community College opened their doors in 1970, whereupon Seattle Community College was renamed Seattle Central Community College.

Seattle Central Community College was named Time magazine's Community College of the Year in 2001.

In March 2014, the board of trustees voted unanimously to change the name from Seattle Community Colleges District to Seattle Colleges District and to change the names of the colleges to Seattle Central College, North Seattle College and South Seattle College.

== Seattle Promise ==
In 2018 Seattle Colleges partnered with the city of Seattle and Seattle Public Schools to launch Seattle Promise, a tuition covering program that aims to expand college access, success, and completion. Seattle Promise was part of the Families and Education Levy passed by citizens of Seattle during the local election of November 2018. In November 2025, Seattle citizens voted to renew the Families and Education Levy, funding the Seattle Promise program through 2032. This time the levy passed with nearly 80 percent voting yes. Seattle Promise offers graduating seniors of Seattle public schools paid tuition for up to two years or 90 credits as well as academic support and advising when they attend Seattle Colleges.

== Leadership and Governance ==
The chief executive officer of Seattle Colleges District is the chancellor. Presidents of each of the three colleges comprising Seattle Colleges—North Seattle College, Seattle Central College, South Seattle College—report to the chancellor. Seattle Colleges is governed by a board of trustees appointed by the governor and approved by the state Senate.

=== Chancellors Since 2000 ===
- 2022–present - Dr. Rosie Rimando-Chareunsap
- 2016–2022 - Dr. Shouan Pan
- 2009-2016 - Dr. Jill Wakefield
- 2003-2008 - Dr. Charles Mitchell
- 1998-2003 - Dr. Peter Ku

== Programs of Study ==
Seattle Colleges offers more than 130 career and technical education programs and academic transfer programs organized by eight areas of study. These programs culminate in certificates and associate degrees, as well as a number of Bachelor of Applied Science degrees and college transfer options. The colleges also offer continuing education programs; concurrent high school enrollment and high school completion programs; and Adult Basic Education/English as a Second Language programs, and corporate and customized training.

== See also ==
- Running Start program
