= Fadi Elsalameen =

Palestinian writer and academic (born 1983)

فادي السلامين Fadi Elsalameen (Fādi El Salameen)
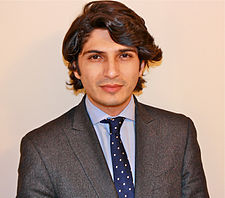
- Born: Fadi Elsalameen; December 12, 1983; Palestine
- Education: Johns Hopkins University (MA)
- Occupation: Businessman

Fadi Elsalameen, sometimes written as Fadi El-Salameen, (born in Hebron on December 12, 1983, Arabic: فادي السلامين) is a non-resident fellow at the Foreign Policy Institute at the Johns Hopkins School of Advanced International Studies (SAIS), and an adjunct senior fellow at the American Security Project, a Washington, DC, think tank, and formerly a fellow with the New America Foundation's American Strategy Program.

== Political life ==
Elsalameen is a critic of the current Palestinian government. Elsalameen is also part of a new non-partisan Palestinian youth movement that calls for nonviolent reform in the Palestinian territories.

== Fund for Palestinian students ==
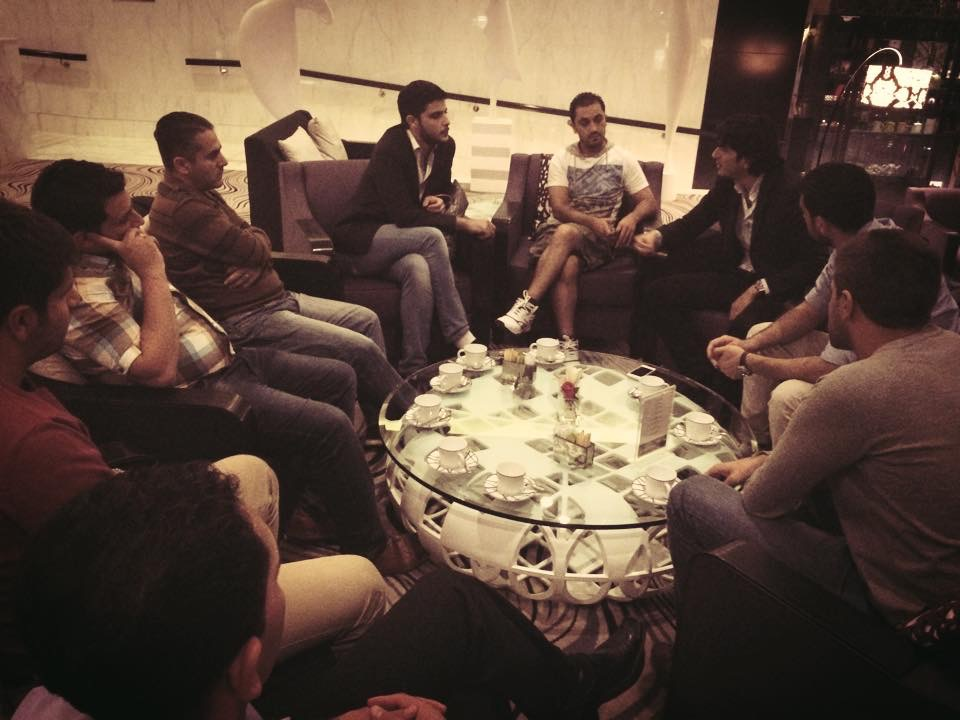
Elsalameen meeting Palestinian Youth in the diaspora

Elsalameen, through the Fadi Elsalameen fund for students in need (Arabic: صندوق فادي السلامين للطالب المحتاج), funds around 30 Palestinian students annually to go to Hebron University (Arabic: جامعة الخليل) and Al-Quds University (Arabic: جامعة القدس) where they focus on fields of studies such as economics, engineering, and medicine.
