= Aida Najjar =

Palestinian-Jordanian writer and researcher (1938–2020)

- عايدة النجار
- Born: 12 December 1938; Lifta, Palestine
- Died: 5 February 2020 (aged 81); Amman, Jordan
- Other names: Aida Ali Ismail Najjar
- Occupation(s): Writer and researcher

Aida Najjar (Arabic: عايدة النجار) (12 December 1938 – 5 February 2020) was a Palestinian-Jordanian writer and researcher.

== Life ==
Najjar was born in Lifta on 12 December 1938. She obtained her bachelor from Cairo University in 1960, the master from the University of Kansas in 1965 and PhD from Syracuse University in 1975. The title of her PhD thesis is The Arabic Press and Nationalism in Palestine, 1920-1948. She worked at United Nations Development Programme (UNDP) and FAO.

Najjar wrote several literary and non-literary books. The most prominent of these books are "Al-Quds and the Shalabiyya girl" and "History of the Palestinian Press".

== Death ==
On 5 February 2020, Najjar died in Amman, Jordan.
