= List of Palestinian Christians =

The following lists of Palestinian Christians are lists of notable Christians who either self-identified as Palestinian, or were referred to as Palestinian in reference of their origin or long-time residence being in the Palestine region, the designation being an endonym and exonym respectively.

== First few centuries AD ==
- Cosmas of Maiuma
- Dorotheus of Gaza
- Hilarion
- Theodore of the Jordan
- Sabbas the Sanctified
- Theophanes the Branded
- Zosimas of Palestine
- Saint Reparata
- Eusebius
- Saint Agapius of Palestine
- Joseph of Tiberias
- Procopius of Scythopolis
- Agapius of Caesarea
- Peter Apselamus
- Joseph of Tiberias
- Saint George
- Zayya
- Epiphanius of Salamis
- Cyril of Jerusalem
- Gelasius of Caesarea
- Hesychius of Jerusalem
- Barsanuphius of Gaza
- John the Prophet
- Dorotheus of Gaza
- Seridus of Gaza
- Vitalis of Gaza
- Maximus the Confessor
- Pope Theodore I
- Stephen the Sabaite
- Theodorus and Theophanes

== Clergy ==
- Sulayman al-Ghazzi - 11th century Bishop of Gaza who was a contemporary to persecutions under Fatimid Caliph Al Hakim
- Angelus of Jerusalem -12th century Jerusalemite Jewish convert to Catholicism in the Kingdom of Jerusalem
- Munib Younan – president of the Lutheran World Federation since 2010 and the Bishop of the Evangelical Lutheran Church of Jerusalem, Palestine, Jordan and the Holy Land since 1998
- Archbishop Theodosios (Hanna) of Sebastia – Bishop of the Eastern Orthodox Patriarchate of Jerusalem
- Michel Sabbah – former Latin Patriarch of Jerusalem (Roman Catholic)
- Fouad Twal – former Latin Patriarch of Jerusalem (Roman Catholic)
- Naim Ateek – leader of Sabeel Christian Ecumenical Foundation
- Mitri Raheb – pastor of the Evangelical Lutheran Christmas Church in Bethlehem
- Suheil Salman Ibrahim Dawani – the current Anglican Bishop in Jerusalem
- Elias Chacour – Archbishop of Akko, Haifa, Nazareth and Galilee of the Melkite Eastern Catholic Church
- Riah Hanna Abu El-Assal – former Anglican Bishop in Jerusalem
- Anis Shorrosh – Palestinian Evangelical Protestant pastor
- Benny Hinn – Protestant televangelist
- Patriarch Theophilos III of Jerusalem – current Orthodox patriarch of Jerusalem
- Manuel Musallam – retired Roman Catholic priest, who was pastor in Gaza from 1995 to 2009.
- Boutros Mouallem – retired Melkite Eastern Catholic Church archbishop of Acre, Haifa and the Galilee
- Samir Kafity – prominent former Anglican Bishop in Jerusalem
- Salim Munayer – founder of Musalaha, a non-profit organization that works towards reconciliation between Israelis and Palestinians based on the Biblical principles of peace, works mainly among Palestinian Evangelical Protestants and Messianic Jews
- Patriarch Diodoros of Jerusalem – late Orthodox Patriarch of Jerusalem
- Patriarch Irenaios – former Orthodox patriarch of Jerusalem
- Torkom Manoogian – current Patriarch of the Armenian Patriarchate of Jerusalem
- Faik Haddad – prominent former Anglican Bishop in Jerusalem.
- Bassim Nijim – Palestinian Lutheran pastor.
- Jean Zaru – Quaker activist, writer, and teacher

== Palestinian Catholics ==
- Category:Palestinian Catholics

== Politicians ==
- John H. Sununu – Governor of New Hampshire (1983–1989) and White House Chief of Staff to President George H. W. Bush (1989–1991)
- Joe Hockey – Treasurer of Australia (2013–2015), Member of Parliament for North Sydney (1996–2015), Ambassador of Australia to the United States (2016-Current)
- Raymonda Tawil – poet, political activist, journalist, writer and the mother-in-law of the late Palestinian President Yasser Arafat
- Antonio Saca – President of El Salvador from 2004 to 2009
- Justin Amash – U.S. Representative for Michigan's 3rd congressional district (2011–2021) which encompasses the Grand Rapids area, and a member of the Libertarian Party (formerly Republican Party)
- Vera Baboun – first female mayor of Bethlehem
- Azmi Bishara – Arab-Israeli politician
- Janet Mikhail – former mayor of Ramallah
- Karim Khalaf – attorney and politician who served as the mayor of Ramallah, but was removed from office in 1982 by Israel
- Victor Batarseh – former mayor of Bethlehem
- Elias Bandak – former mayor of Bethlehem
- Hanna Nasser – former mayor of Bethlehem
- Elias Freij – former mayor of Bethlehem
- Emil Habibi – politician born in Mandatory Palestine, leader of the Israel Communist Party and Member of the Israeli Knesset
- Ameer Makhoul – founder of the Haifa-based Ittijah (the Union of Arab Community-Based Associations, a network for Palestinian NGOs in Israel), who is jailed in Israel until released in 2019, after some claims for spying on behalf of Hezbollah. Amnesty International expressed concern that "his human rights activism on behalf of Palestinians" may be the reason for his imprisonment.
- George Habash – politician, founder of the PFLP and the Arab Nationalist Movement
- Nayif Hawatmeh – Palestinian politician, founder and General Secretary of the DFLP
- Dr. Hanan Ashrawi – politician, legislator, activist, and scholar. Currently, she is a leader of the Third Way party. She was previously notable as a spokesperson for Arafat.
- Afif Safieh – diplomat and was most recently the Palestinian ambassador to the Russian Federation
- Yusif Sayigh – economist, and member of the Palestine Liberation Organization
- Joudeh George Murqos – former Palestinian minister of tourism
- Ghazi Hanania – member of the Palestinian Legislative Council and Fatah
- Emil Ghuri – former Secretary of the Arab Higher Committee (AHC), the official leadership of the Arabs in the British Mandate of Palestine. He was also the general secretary of the Palestine Arab Party
- Hanna Nasser (academic) – academic, political figure and ex-president of Birzeit University
- Ghassan Andoni – a professor of physics at Birzeit University, co-founder of the International Solidarity Movement (ISM) and founder of the International Middle East Media Centre
- Daud Turki – poet and was the leader of the Jewish-Arab left-wing group called the Red Front
- Imil Jarjoui – former member of the Palestinian Legislative Council and the PLO executive committee
- Huwaida Arraf – rights activist and co-founder of the International Solidarity Movement (ISM)
- Michael Tarazi – lawyer and former adviser to the Palestine Liberation Organization
- Kamal Nasser – PLO political leader, writer and poet
- Layla Moran – first British MP of Palestinian descent
- Elias Sanbar – Palestinian ambassador to UNESCO
- Issam Sartawi – Senior member of the PLO
- Zuhdi Labib Terzi – Terzi was the first Ambassador, Permanent Observer of Palestine to the United Nations and served from 1974 to 1991.
- Nayib Bukele – President of El Salvador since 2019
- Nasry Asfura – President of Honduras since 2026
- Salvador Nasralla – Vice President of Honduras 2022-2024
- Hana Tarazi– member of the National Committee for the Administration of Gaza

== Journalists ==
- Shireen Abu Akleh – journalist who worked as a reporter for the Arabic-language channel Al Jazeera for 25 years
- Issa El-Issa – the founder of Filastin newspaper in Jaffa, Palestine 1909
- Yousef El-Issa – Issa's cousin who also founded Filastin newspaper in 1909, he also established Alif Ba' newspaper in Damascus, Syria
- Raja El-Issa – Issa's son, who took manager position of the newspaper after his father's death, he was also the first chairman of the Jordan Press Association in Amman, Jordan in 1956
- Daoud El-Issa – Issa's nephew who also had the manager position of the newspaper, established Al-Bilad newspaper in Jerusalem in 1956 and became a member of Jordan Press Association in 1976
- Tawfiq Sayigh – editor of Hiwar magazine

== Cultural figures ==
- Ashraf Barhom – Christian actor from Tarshiha, northern Israel.
- Edward Said – Palestinian literary theorist, cultural critic, political activist
- Rosemarie Said Zahlan – historian and writer
- George Antonius – founder of modern Arab nationalist history
- Khalil Beidas – scholar, educator, translator and novelist during the Al-Nahda cultural renaissance
- Khalil al-Sakakini – educator, scholar, poet, and Arab nationalist during the Al-Nahda cultural renaissance
- Tawfiq Canaan – physician, researcher of Palestinian popular heritage
- May Ziadeh – poet, essayist and translator during the Al-Nahda cultural renaissance
- Elia Suleiman – Palestinian film maker and actor
- Hanna Musleh – Palestinian film maker and university professor
- Raja Shehadeh – lawyer and writer
- Rifat Odeh Kassis – human rights activist
- George Saliba – Professor of Arabic and Islamic Science at the Department of Middle Eastern, South Asian, and African Studies, Columbia University, New York, United States
- Rami George Khouri – journalist and editor
- Hisham Zreiq – award-winning independent film maker, poet and visual artist
- Ray Hanania – Palestinian-American journalist also known for his stand-up comedy
- Joseph Massad – Associate Professor of Modern Arab Politics and Intellectual History in the Department of Middle Eastern, South Asian, and African Studies at Columbia University
- Rim Banna – singer, composer, and arranger who is well known for her modern interpretations of traditional Palestinian folk songs
- Amal Murkus – singer
- Anton Shammas – essayist, writer of fiction and poetry and translator
- Fady Andraos – singer and actor
- Karl Sabbagh – Palestinian-British writer, journalist and television producer
- Suleiman Mansour – Prominent Palestinian painter
- Sabri Jiryis – writer and lawyer
- Leila Sansour – film director
- Makram Khoury – actor
- Clara Khoury – actress
- Kamal Boullata – artist & writer, Boulatta is the author of several studies on Palestinian art in particular, Palestinian Art (Saqi 2009) and Between Exits: Paintings by Hani Zurob (Black Dog 2012).
- Steve Sabella – artist
- Ibrahim Fawal – Palestinian American academic, former professor, and author of the historical novel On the Hills of God.
- Widad Kawar – Palestinian ethnic and cultural art collector.
- Basheer Nijim – Palestinian-American geographic.
- Lilli Karnik – Palestinian poet.
- Shadia Mansour – British-Palestinian rapper
- Khader El-Yateem – Palestinian and American community organiser and Lutheran pastor

== Militants ==
- Sirhan Sirhan – assassin of United States Senator Robert F. Kennedy
- Chris Bandak – Palestinian Christian militant and a leader of the Al-Aqsa Martyrs' Brigades and the Tanzim, both armed wings of the Fatah movement, convicted and imprisoned in Israel until 2011.
- Wadie Haddad – Palestinian leader of the Popular Front for the Liberation of Palestine's armed wing. He was responsible for organizing several civilian airplane hijackings in support of the Palestinian cause in the 1960s and 1970s.
- George Habash – founded the Popular Front for the Liberation of Palestine.
- Luttif Afif – the commander of the Black September Organization (BSO) unit that carried out the 1972 Munich massacre, was reported to have at least a partial Christian background.
- Nayef Hawatmeh – a leader of the Palestinian organization, the Democratic Front for the Liberation of Palestine (DFLP).
- Therese Halsa – Member of the Black September Organization and one of the four hijackers of Sabena Flight 571 in Tel Aviv-Lod International Airport, Israel in 1972.
- Daniel Saba George ("Abu Hamama") – A senior Tanzim operative, was killed by Israel in 2006.

== Businesspeople ==
- Yousef Beidas – founder of Intra Bank
- Hind Khoury – Palestinian Delegate-General to France
- Hasib Sabbagh – entrepreneur and businessman
- Zahi Khouri – Palestinian-American businessman and entrepreneur

== Activists ==
- Lina Abu Akleh – Palestinian-Armenian human rights advocate, niece of Shireen Abu Akleh
- Sumaya Farhat Naser – peace activist
- Mubarak Awad – Palestinian-American psychologist and an advocate of nonviolent resistance
- Alex Odeh – Palestinian-American anti-discrimination activist
- Khalil Jahshan – lecturer in International Studies and Languages at Pepperdine University and executive director of its Seaver College Washington DC Internship Program
- Salim Joubran – Justice on the Israeli Supreme Court
- Mira Awad – singer, actress and songwriter
- Hanna Siniora – publisher and human rights activist
- Georgette Rizek – Palestinian philanthropist and activist.
- Michel Mitri – head of the Jaffa Labour Union during the Mandate, Christian Orthodox
- Richard Hanania — Palestinian-American right-wing political commentator

== Canonized by the Catholic Church ==
- Saint Marie-Alphonsine Danil Ghattas – founder of the Congregation of the Rosary Sisters, the only Arab religious order in the Holy Land to date
- Saint Mariam Baouardy

== Other ==
- Sami Aldeeb – Palestinian-Swiss lawyer and author of many books and articles on Arab and Islamic law born to a Palestinian Christian family; left Christianity and became a nontheist.
- Roberto Bishara – Palestinian football defender
- Ibrahim Hazboun – Palestinian astrologer
- Michel Shehadeh – Palestinian-American, member of the Los Angeles 8
- Valerie Tarazi — Palestinian-American swimmer
- Khalil Totah – educator and education advocate

== See also ==
- List of Palestinians
