= Makhoul =

Makhoul is a surname. Notable people with the surname include:

- Ameer Makhoul, Israeli Palestinian Christian convicted in 2011 of espionage
- Issam Makhoul (1952–2025), Israeli Arab politician
- John Makhoul, Lebanese-American computer scientist
- Leena Makhoul (born 1993), Palestinian singer-songwriter
