= Abu-Ezam =

The Abu-Ezam (or Abu-Etham) family is a Palestinian Christian family formerly engaged in numerous businesses, most notably in the manufacturing sector prior to the 1948 Palestinian expulsion and flight in Palestine. They owned and operated several businesses in the city of Ramla in modern-day Israel.
