= Michel Shehadeh =

American-Palestinian activist

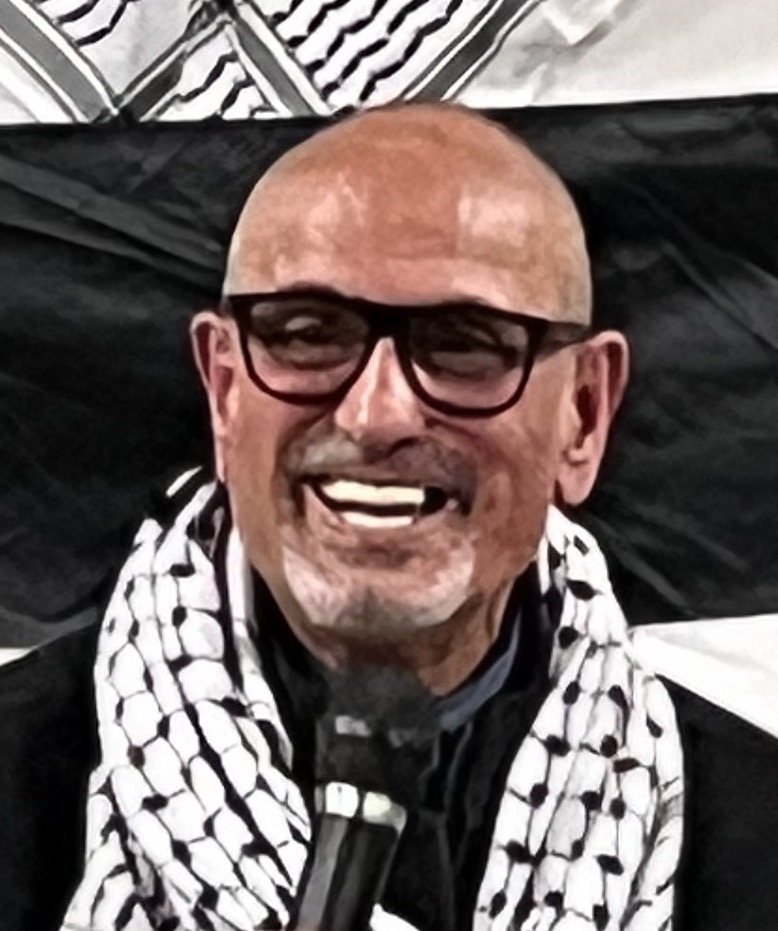
- Born: Amman, Jordan
- Education: California State University, Long Beach
- Occupations: Director, community leader

Michel Shehadeh born in 1956, in Amman, Jordan, to a Palestinian Christian family, is the Palestinian-American executive director of the Arab Film Festival and the former western regional director of the American-Arab Anti-Discrimination Committee (1996–2003).

Raised in Palestine, Shehadeh relocated to the United States for college in 1975. He holds a BA in Journalism and a Master's in Public Administration from California State University, Long Beach.

On January 26, 1987, Shehadeh and seven other Los Angeles residents (dubbed 'The L.A. Eight') were arrested under the Immigration and Nationality Act of 1952 on the basis of alleged support for the Popular Front for the Liberation of Palestine (designated a terrorist group by the US in 1997). After the government refused to disclose exculpatory evidence, in 2007 the judge in the case dismissed the charges against Shehadeh and another member of the LA8. The judge called the prolonged proceedings an "embarrassment to the rule of law".
