= Hind Khoury =

Palestinian politician

- هند خوري

Delegate General of the Palestine Liberation Organization to France
- In office March 2006 – June 2010

Personal details
- Born: 12 June 1953 (age 73) Bethlehem, Jordanian-administered West Bank, Palestine
- Education: Birzeit University; American University of Beirut; Boston University
- Occupation: Politician, economist
- Known for: Minister of State for Jerusalem Affairs, General Secretary of Kairos Palestine

Hind Khoury (Arabic: هند خوري, born 12 June 1953) is a Palestinian politician and economist. She was the delegate general of the Palestine Liberation Organization to France from March 2006 until June 2010.

== Biography ==
Born in Bethlehem, Palestine, then under Jordanian rule, to a Christian family, Khoury was educated in a school run by nuns. She studied economics at Birzeit University near Ramallah, then at the American University of Beirut before the start of the Lebanese Civil War. She then returned to Bethlehem.

After the First Intifada, she studied management at Boston University in its Beersheba campus, while working with the United Nations Development Programme.

In March 2005, she became Minister of State for Jerusalem Affairs in the Palestinian National Authority, in the government formed shortly after the election of Mahmoud Abbas to the presidency. Little known, she did not succeed in the legislative elections of January 2006. She was later sent to France as a representative of Palestine.

She is General Secretary of Kairos Palestine.

== See also ==
- Khoury
