= Rateb Y. Rabie =

Rateb Y. Rabie KCHS
- Born: 7 March 1954 (age 72); Amman, Jordan
- Organization: Holy Land Christian Ecumenical Foundation
- Spouse: Rocio Rabie (m. 1980)
- Parent(s): Yacoub and Salimeh Mousa Rabie

Rateb Y. Rabie, KCHS is a Jordanian-born activist who is the founder and president of the Holy Land Christian Ecumenical Foundation (HCEF). He is also the co-founder and past president of the Birzeit Society.

== Personal ==
Rabie was born in 1954 in Amman, Jordan to Palestinian parents. Rabie went to the United States in 1976 for his college education. In 1980, Rabie married a native of Ecuador whom he met in the United States.

== HCEF ==
Rabie founded HCEF in 1998 with other Arab and Palestinian Christians in the West Bank. HCEF is a charitable faith-based development organization, with over 20 programs, and offices in Washington, DC and Bethlehem.

== KTH ==
In 2011, Rabie founded the Know Thy Heritage (KTH) Leadership Program, along with Hashim Shawa, Samer Khoury, and other business people. KTH helps to familiarize Palestinian youth living abroad with the tools with the Palestinian culture in Palestine. The second project is the promoting business and investment in Palestine by expatriate Palestinians and other investors.

== Achievements ==
Rabie has worked to improved living conditions for Palestinian Christians and preserving Palestine's Christian heritage. Rabie has organized over 20 international conferences of religious, civic and political leaders, Muslim, Jews, and Christians to promote justice and tolerance in the Middle East.

Rabie formed a coalition of major U.S. Muslim organizations and Christian Churches with the goal of protecting Christians and other religious minorities in Arab countries. The coalition elected him as chair of the steering committee.

== Sources ==
1. https://palestiniansurprises.com/surprise/rateb-rabie/
2. http://www.arabamerica.com/arab-american-perspectives-on-pope-francis-u-s-visit/
3. http://www.idcsummit.org/sir-rateb-rabie-bio/
4. http://thearabdailynews.com/2014/09/22/podcast-sir-rateb-rabie-middle-east-christians/
5. https://www.medjugorje.ws/en/articles/rateb-rabie-holy-land-christian-ecumenical-foundation-visit-medjugorje/
6. http://ncronline.org/person/rateb-rabie
7. http://islamicommentary.org/tag/rateb-rabie/
8. http://www.anti-semitism.net/christian/sir-rateb-rabie-being-talked-about-unity-of-muslismchristian.php
9. http://english.pnn.ps/2015/10/25/hcef-holds-awards-banquet-at-annual-international-conference/
10. https://www.prleap.com/pr/42251/dr-leon-hesser-palestinian-sir-rateb-rabie-seek
11. http://theamericanmuslim.org/tam.php/features/articles/u.s.-muslim-christian-coalition-formed-to-protect-religious-minorities-in-a
12. http://fravelinogonzalez.com/2015/10/03/saint-gabriel-catholic-church-receives-gift-from-the-palestinian-christians/
13. http://www.aaiusa.org/what-you-might-have-missed-from-the-in-defense-of-christians-summit
14. http://www.arabamerica.com/arab-american-perspectives-on-pope-francis-u-s-visit/
15. http://houseofdeputies.org/episcopal-church-invests-in-bank-of-palestine.html
16. http://en.abouna.org/en/holylands/society-st-yves-receive-2015-living-stones-solidarity-award
17. https://www.comeandsee.com/view.php?sid=1058
