= Imil Jarjoui =

Palestinian politician

Imil Musa Basil Jarjoui
- إميل موسى بسيل جرجوعي

Member of the Palestinian Legislative Council
- In office 7 March 1996 – 24 November 2007

Member of the Executive Committee of the Palestine Liberation Organization
- In office ?–?

Personal details
- Born: 21 July 1936 Jerusalem, Palestine
- Died: 24 November 2007 (aged 71) Jerusalem
- Party: Fatah
- Profession: Politician, physician

Imil (Emile) Musa Basil Jarjoui MD (Arabic: إميل موسى بسيل جرجوعي; 21 July 1936 – 24 November 2007) was a Palestinian politician and physician who was a member of the Palestinian Legislative Council and the Executive Committee of the Palestine Liberation Organization. Dr. Jarjoui also headed the Palestinian Ministerial Investigation Commission for the deal of Jaffa Gate and was a member of the Palestinian Legislative Council.

Born to a Palestinian Christian family, he was elected to the former post in 2006 as a Fatah candidate for one of the seats reserved for Christians in Jerusalem. He dealt with Christian affairs for the Palestinian Authority while it was controlled by Fatah. He headed the committee which welcomed the Pope John Paul II in January 2000.

He also owned the Christmas Hotel in East Jerusalem.

Jarjoui died on 23 November 2007 in Jerusalem of a heart attack. He was 72.
