= Zahi Khouri =

Palestinian businessman

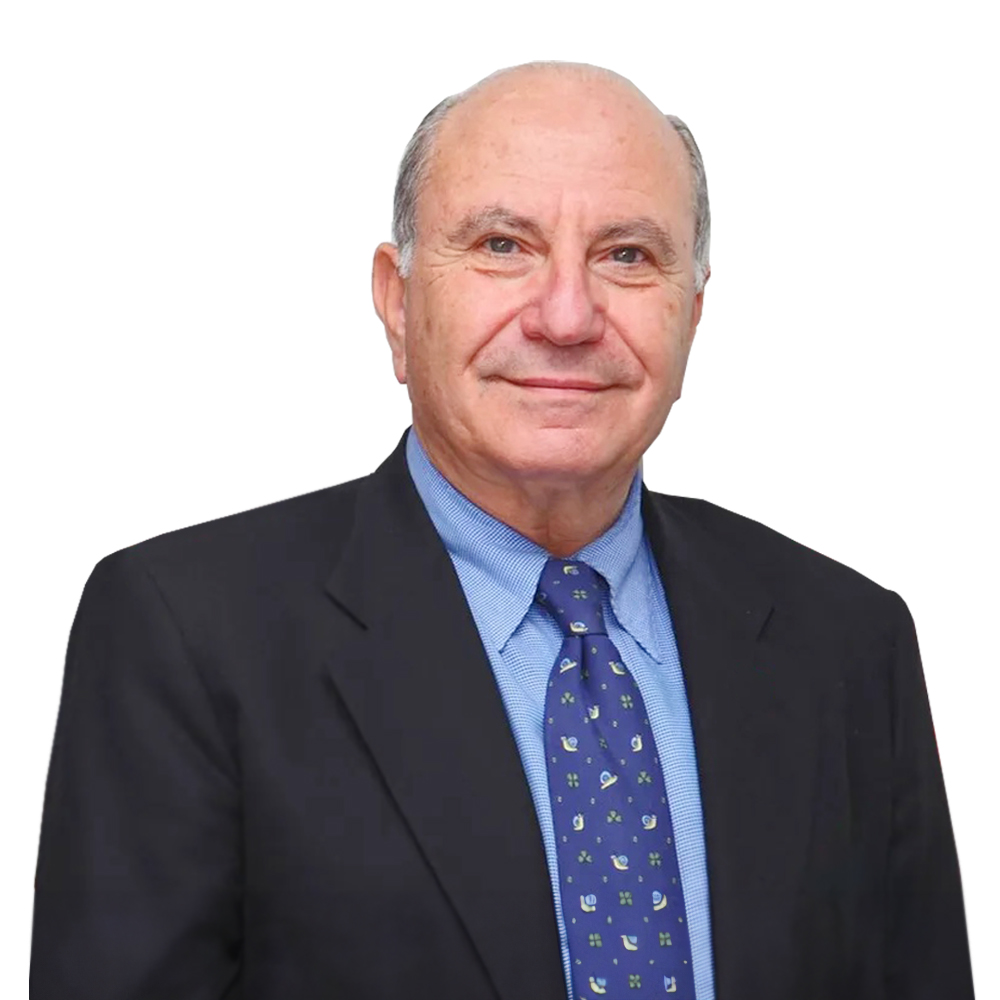
Image of Zahi Khoury

Zahi W. Khouri is a Palestinian-American businessman and entrepreneur, who is best known for his involvement in numerous business ventures in the Palestinian territories.

== Biography ==
=== Early life and education ===
Khouri was born into a Palestinian Christian family in 1938 in the city of Jaffa, then part of Mandatory Palestine. His family fled the city during the 1948 Arab–Israeli War, along with the majority of its Arab inhabitants, becoming Palestinian refugees in neighboring Lebanon. Khouri has described himself as "a faithful Christian". Khouri lived in Lebanon until the 1960s, when he moved to Germany to pursue an advanced degree.

Khouri earned a Master's degree in Engineering from the Stuttgart Institute of Technology, before going on to receive an M.B.A. from the European Institute of Business Administration, INSEAD in Fontainebleau, France.

=== Career ===
In 1967, he moved to the United States, where he settled in Richmond, Virginia and built a career in international business. "Mr. Khouri was an Executive Board Member of The Olayan Group in Saudi Arabia (as CEO of Olayan Saudi Holdings) and NY (as CEO of Olayan Development Co) for over 20 years. He also holds a number of civic positions among others, the Chairman of NGO Development Center (NDC) in Jerusalem, the Palestine Business Committee for Peace and Reform (PBCPR) in Washington, the Carter Advisory body in Palestine and Chairman of the local chapter of Partners for New Beginning, affiliated with Aspen Institute".

Following the signing of the Oslo Accords between Israel and the Palestine Liberation Organization in 1993, which granted limited sovereignty to the Palestinians in parts of the West Bank and Gaza Strip, Khouri moved back to Palestine in order to establish business ventures there along with several other Palestinian entrepreneurs. He helped establish the Palestinian Development and Investment Company (PADICO), the largest Palestinian investment company, as well as the Palestinian National Beverage Company, which manufactures and markets Coca-Cola products under official franchise in the West Bank and Gaza Strip. He was also the CEO of Jawwal, the only Palestinian telecommunications company and cellular service provider.

Khouri has been an outspoken critic of the Israeli occupation of the Palestinian territories and has met with American government officials as a representative of the Palestinian business community to voice concern over the effects of the Israeli occupation and embargo on the Palestinian economy. He has also published editorials in major U.S. newspapers condemning Israeli practices and calling for equal rights for Palestinians.
