= The L.A. Eight =

The Los Angeles Eight were a group of seven Palestinian immigrants and a Kenyan woman who were political activists arrested for their supposed involvement in the Popular Front for the Liberation of Palestine (PFLP). The PFLP is a Marxist–Leninist offshoot group of the Palestine Liberation Organization (PLO) and has been tied to international terrorist activities like bombings and assassinations.

At the time of their arrest, the McCarran–Walter Act was used as support to deport the Eight based on their alleged affiliation with a communist organization as non-citizens. The L.A. Eight's case made it all the way to the Supreme Court, with the plaintiffs' core arguments centering on First Amendments rights. The court cases and deportation proceedings for the group's members spanned a 20-year period, finally coming to a resolution in 2007 before Immigration Judge Bruce J. Einhorn.

The eight members were Basher Amer; Aiad Barakat; Amjad Obeid; Ayman Obeid; Naim Sharif; Julie Mungai; Michel Shehadeh; and Khader Hamide. Julie Mungai was the wife of Khader Hamide. Five of the eight members were in the U.S. on student or travel visas at the time of arrest, while Michel Shehadeh and Khader Hamide were already permanent residents.

== Background and arrests ==
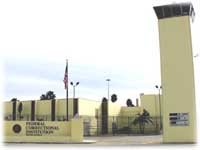
The Terminal Island Federal Correctional Institution, where members of the L.A. Eight were held at for three weeks.

The L.A. Eight case started in the late 1980s and brought constitutional questions about first amendment rights for Arab immigrants to light. Seven Palestinian activists and one Kenyan activist were arrested after they took part in a protest and distributed Palestinian newspaper articles. The charge brought against the L.A. Eight was being a "member of or affiliated with the Popular Front for the Liberation of Palestine, an organization that advocated the economic, international and governmental doctrines of world Communism through written and/or printed publications". They were arrested, taken at gunpoint and put into solitary confinement at Terminal Island Prison which is a maximum security prison. All of the members of the L.A. Eight had entered the United States legally on valid visas. Hamide and Shehadeh were legal permanent residents of the United States for years at the point of their arrest. The Eight were held for three weeks while the FBI tried to bring suit. The FBI was unable to find any evidence that linked any of the L.A Eight to illegal activity despite three years of heavy surveillance prior to the group's arrests.

A few months following the initial arrest, the original charges were dropped and five of the members who were in the country on student and travel visas were instead charged with technical visa violations. Hamide and Shehadeh, permanent residents at the time, were instead charged as deportable under provisions in the McCarran-Walter Act. These provisions authorized the deportation of non-citizens, who advocated for or were affiliated with organizations that promoted the unlawful damage or destruction of property.

The arrest of Arab-Americans without evidence was not an event isolated to the L.A. Eight. In 1998, a man named Hany Kiareldeen, who was an immigrant from Palestine, was arrested and imprisoned by U.S. immigration authorities. The immigration authorities claimed to have used secret evidence that deemed Kiareldeen a national security threat. The secret evidence was never shared with Kiareldeen. He spent 19 months in trial without ever seeing the evidence that proved he was a security threat. Kiareldeen was released from jail after a federal judge ruled in 1999 that his detention was unconstitutional. The use of secret evidence to incriminate Arabs and Muslims without reliable proof that they have committed a crime may be at worst a biased view of Muslims and at best an ignorant stereotype. The unfair treatment of Arab-Americans would worsen after the horrible events of 9/11 and the subsequent passage of the USA Patriot Act.

== Legal proceedings ==
The L.A. Eight members were embroiled in legal proceedings following their initial arrest in 1987. Although the Eight entered court proceedings together, only two of the Eight were U.S. permanent residents at the time. This led to a variance in the application of the court opinions to the various members. Multiple court cases were involved over the 20-year span of legal proceedings including the following, several of which had the American-Arab Anti-Discrimination Committee advocated on their behalf.

=== American-Arab Anti-Discrimination Committee v Meese ===
The case of American-Arab Anti-Discrimination Committee v. Meese took place in 1989 in the California District Courts. The L.A. Eight requested the court readdress the constitutionality of the McCarran-Walter provisions and section 901 of the Foreign Relations Authorization Act (Fiscal Years 1988 and 1989) as it applied to their case. The concluding opinion of the court held that immigrants legally within the United States are granted the protection of First Amendment rights, without limitation by the government.

=== Reno v. American-Arab Anti-Discrimination Committee ===
The case of Reno v. American-Arab Anti-Discrimination Committee was put before the Supreme Court almost a decade later in 1998. The case reversed the ruling in ADC v. Meese and a prior ADC v. Reno appellate ruling that allowed the L.A. Eight to challenge their deportation on constitutional grounds. The ADC v. Reno ruling had held that the Constitution does not permit guilt by association and required the government to prove Hamide's and Shehadeh's intention to support the PFLP's illegal group activity in order for the deportation process to advance. The writer of the majority opinion, Justice Antonin Scalia, held that due to §1252(g) of the Illegal Immigration Reform and Immigrant Responsibility Act of 1996, federal courts lacked jurisdiction over the L.A. Eight selective-law-enforcement suit. He further concluded that even if there were political motivations involved, immigrants unlawfully in the United States could not demand judicial review of their deportation before the process was completed.

=== Immigration court ===
Khader Hamide's and Michel Shehadeh's lengthy time in court proceedings finally came to a close in 2007 in the California immigration courts. Judge Bruce J. Einhorn, who presided over the case, concluded that the government's prolonged failure to provide evidence that supported the deportation of the two men violated their constitutional due process rights and terminated the court proceedings. Initially, the government appealed Judge Einhorn's ruling, but soon after negotiations with the plaintiffs led to a settlement. The settlement required Hamide and Shehadeh to wait three years before being able to apply for U.S. Citizenship and to regard several of their previous court orders as moot, including Judge Einhorn's ruling in 2007.
