= Khalil Jahshan =

Khalil Elias Jahshan
- Born: May 9, 1948 (age 78); Nazareth, British Mandate of Palestine
- Education: Harding University
- Occupation: Chairman of Board of Directors Arab Center Washington DC
- Employer: Arab Center Washington DC Inc.
- Title: Chairman of Board of Directors
- Spouse: Joan (1973-present)
- Children: Mark E. Jahshan Amanda J. Jahshan
- Parent: Elias K. Jahshan Alice N. Nakhleh

Khalil Jahshan (Arabic: خليل جهشان) (born in Nazareth, British Mandate of Palestine in 1948) is a Palestinian-American political analyst and media commentator. He serves currently as executive director of Arab Center Washington DC, a nonprofit think tank focusing on U.S. foreign policy in the Middle East. Between 2004 and 2013, Jahshan was a lecturer in International Studies and Languages at Pepperdine University and executive director of its Seaver College Washington DC Internship Program. He received a bachelor's degree in political science and French from Harding University in 1972.

== Early life ==
Jahshan was born to a Palestinian Christian family in Nazareth, British Mandate of Palestine in 1948. He completed his elementary (Ecole Jesu Adolescent-Don Bosco) and secondary education (Terra Sancta) there. In 1969, he traveled to the United States to pursue his college education at Harding University.

== Titles and positions ==
- Member of the boards of directors and advisory boards of various Middle East-oriented groups, including ANERA, MIFTAH and Search for Common Ground in the Middle East

== See also ==
- American-Arab Anti-Discrimination Committee
- National Association of Arab-Americans
- Palestinian Christians
