= Issam Makhoul =

Israeli politician (1952–2025)

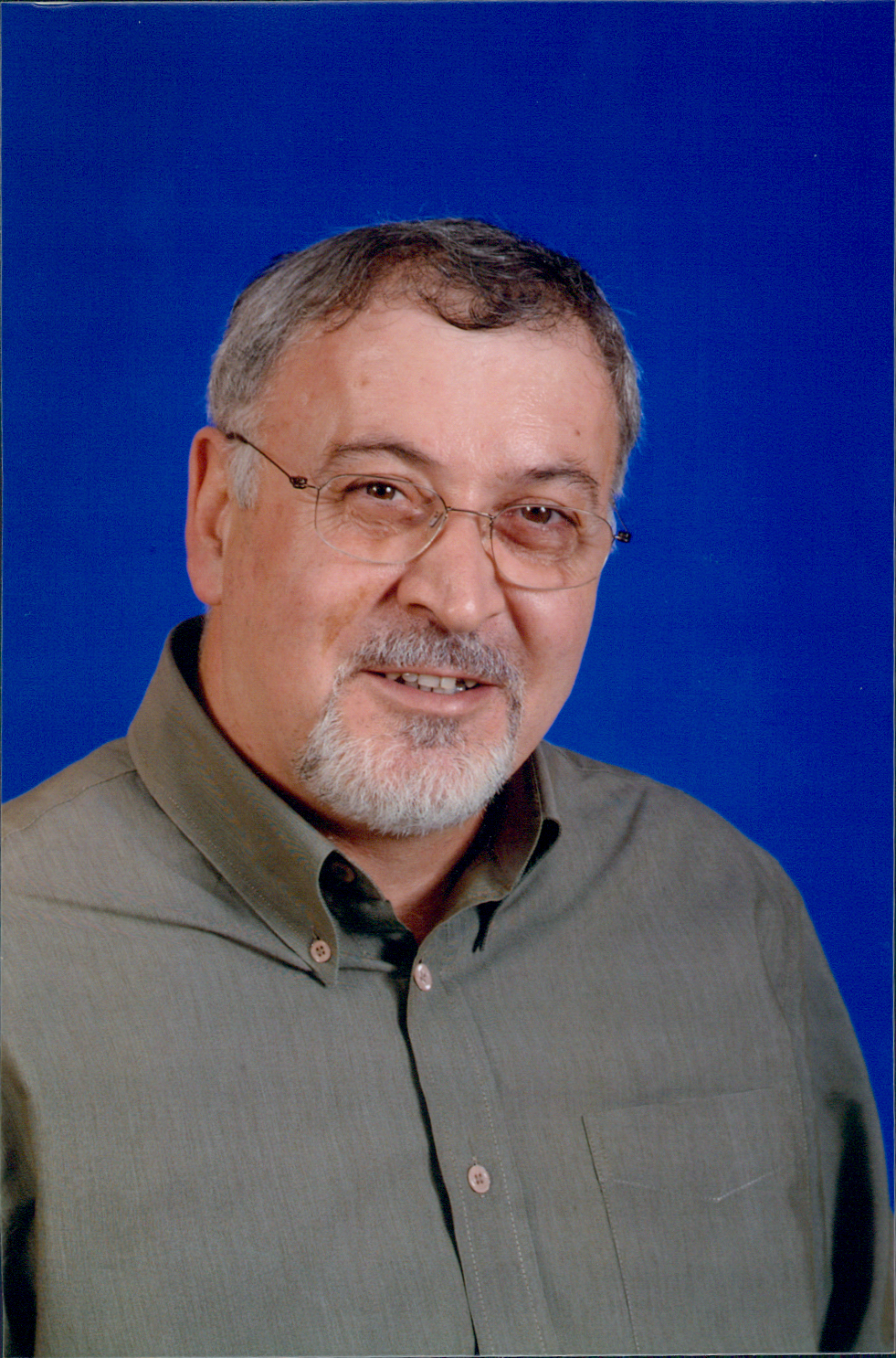
- Makhoul's Knesset portrait

Faction represented in the Knesset
- 1999–2006: Hadash

Chairman of Hadash
- In office 2023–2025
- Preceded by: Ayman Odeh

General Secretary of Maki
- In office 2002–2007
- Preceded by: Mohamed Nafa
- Succeeded by: Mohamed Nafa

Personal details
- Born: 18 July 1952 Peki'in, Israel
- Died: 26 December 2025 (aged 73)

Issam Makhoul (Arabic: عصام مخول, Hebrew: עיסאם מח'ול; 18 July 1952 – 26 December 2025) was an Israeli Arab politician who served as a member of the Knesset for Hadash from 1999 to 2006. A prominent figure in Maki, he served as its General Secretary from 2002 to 2007 and was elected Chairman of Hadash in 2023. In his capacity as party leader, he oversaw the party's domestic activities and its international relations with other communist parties. In 2003, while serving in the Knesset, Makhoul was the target of a failed assassination attempt by a right-wing extremist involving a car bomb at his home in Haifa.

== Life and career ==
Born in Peki'in, Makhoul studied philosophy and sociology at the University of Haifa, gaining a MA. During his time at university he also became the first chairman of the National Union of Arab Students following its establishment in 1976. After graduating he worked as a sociologist, and was a member of the Emile Touma Institute for Political and Historical Research, which he chaired from 2010 onwards.

=== Political career ===
Makhoul joined Maki in 1977, serving as secretary of the Haifa branch during the 1980s. In 1993 he became a member of the party's politburo. He was elected to the Knesset on the Hadash list (an alliance led by Maki) in 1999 and was re-elected in 2003. He was an active critic of Israel's nuclear weapons program, and in 2000 was the first Knesset member to attempt a break in Israel's "nuclear ambiguity" policy by prompting an open debate on Israel's atomic program. He was also a supporter of Mordechai Vanunu, the former Israeli nuclear technician who was imprisoned for revealing details of Israel's nuclear weapons program to the British press in 1986, and called for Vanunu's release on several occasions. In 2002 he was elected secretary-general of Maki, holding the post until 2007.

==== Assassination attempt ====
On 24 October 2003, Makhoul was the target of an assassination attempt when an explosive device was planted in his private car in central Haifa. Makhoul and his wife, Suad, were preparing to leave their home; Makhoul reversed his Knesset-supplied Ford out of the driveway while his wife started their personal Honda to pick up their twin children from school. The Honda's ignition sparked an explosion, engulfing the vehicle in flames, but Suad managed to escape the blast unhurt.

Responding to the attack, Makhoul stated: "I have no doubt that this is a politically motivated event... an attempt to harm me based on my views and positions," adding that the attempt would not deter his determination to express his opinions.

The subsequent investigation led to the arrest of Eliran Golan and Alexander Rabinovitch, two Jewish men from Haifa motivated by nationalist sentiment. Golan admitted to investigators that he hated Arabs and had planned to target other prominent Arab figures, including Mohammad Barakeh, Azmi Bishara, and Ahmad Tibi. Golan, the primary perpetrator, committed suicide while in custody in September 2005. Rabinovitch was convicted of aiding the attempt and supplying explosive materials; while initially sentenced to four years of actual imprisonment, the Supreme Court later extended his term to five years following an appeal.

=== Later activities ===
Makhoul lost his seat in the 2006 elections. Thereafter he was involved in improving ties between Maki and the Chinese Communist Party. He became chairman of Hadash in 2023.

=== Personal life and death ===
Makhoul was married to Suad Nasr-Makhoul, a Palestinian-Israeli artist and urban planner. Makhoul had two children and lived in Haifa. His brother Ameer was a director of the Haifa-based Ittijah, the Union of Arab Community-Based Associations. Makhoul died on 26 December 2025, at the age of 73.

== Political positions ==
Makhoul's political worldview was shaped by Marxism-Leninism, anti-imperialism, and a consistent emphasis on joint Jewish-Arab mobilization against fascism and state-sponsored nationalism.

=== Israeli-Palestinian conflict and the two-state solution ===
Makhoul was an ardent proponent of the two-state solution, which he characterized as the only viable framework for regional peace, while vehemently criticizing factions on both the Israeli right and alternative Palestinian political spectrum who sought to deny or undermine it. He viewed popular resistance against the occupation as a historical necessity, reflecting on the lessons of the First Intifada during its 50th anniversary in 2017.

He rejected unilateral political moves by the Israeli government. In 2004, he argued that Ariel Sharon's unilateral disengagement plan was an admission of the "failure of the military option" rather than a genuine peace initiative. Later, during the 2020 West Bank annexation proposals, he advocated for a renewed "popular intifada" as the necessary civil response to foil the formal appropriation of Palestinian lands. Near the end of his life in 2025, he maintained that "the Palestinian struggle will not disappear," asserting that regional updates were steering the conflict into a "new era" of resistance.

=== Domestic Arab politics and coalition strategy ===
Within Arab-Israeli politics, Makhoul was highly critical of strategies that prioritized political opportunism over foundational principles. Following the decision of Ra'am to join the Israeli governing coalition in 2021, Makhoul published a sharp rebuke titled "Influence" will not be made from a position of dependency and tail-ending. He argued that true political influence for Arab citizens could not be achieved by acting as a compliant appendage to right-wing or Zionist ruling coalitions, but rather through programmatic, independent opposition alongside progressive Jewish allies.

=== Anti-Zionism and anti-fascism ===
In his early writings, such as his 1985 essay The Struggle Against Kahanism and Official Racism, Makhoul argued that the anti-racist movement in Israel could not cleanly separate the extremist ideology of Meir Kahane from the official policies of the state. He claimed that the structural contradictions between Zionism and true democracy must be continuously exposed through "uncompromising ideological debate." However, he frequently noted that many individual Zionists actively and validly partnered with communist factions in immediate struggles for civil rights and democratic protections. Following the 2019 elections, he intensified his focus on countering what he categorized as creeping state fascism, demanding the immediate formation of an broad, egalitarian "anti-fascist front."

=== Internationalism and anti-imperialism ===
As a representative of Maki on the global stage, Makhoul consistently opposed Western military interventions and built deep ties with foreign left-wing movements. He represented Maki at the founding congress of the Greek left-wing party Syriza in 2013, as well as the conference of Communist Parties from the Eastern Mediterranean Basin.

His anti-imperialist framework dictated a strict non-interventionist stance regarding Arab states; during the First Libyan Civil War in 2011, he openly opposed the NATO-led military intervention, writing that foreign bombs would only derail the legitimate domestic struggles of the Libyan people. He was also a firm supporter of Cuba, using a 2004 state visit to Havana to lambast Israel’s diplomatic alignment with the United States embargo against the island.
