= Chris Bandak =

Palestinian militant

- كريس بندك
- Born: 13 January 1979 (age 47); Beit Lahem, Israeli-occupied West Bank
- Military career
- Allegiance: Fatah
- Branch: Al-Aqsa Martyrs' Brigades
- Service years: 2000–2006
- Conflicts: Second Intifada

Chris Bandak (Arabic: كريس البندك; born 13 January 1979) (alternatively transliterated as Chris Benedict) is a Palestinian militant, who was convicted in Israel for killing two Israeli motorists and wounding a third during the Second Intifada. He is a Greek Orthodox Christian.

Bandak was born into a Palestinian Christian family on January 13, 1979, in Bethlehem. He was born near the Church of the Nativity, said to mark the birthplace of Jesus of Nazareth, and his parents gave him the name Chris through its association with messiahship and since they believe Jesus to be of Palestinian descent as well as a savior of the Palestinians. He has an older brother named Khader. Chris' mother abandoned them when he was one years old. He was reportedly a leader of the Al-Aqsa Martyrs' Brigades and the Tanzim, both armed wings of the Fatah movement. As a result of conviction for crimes related to this involvement he was imprisoned by Israel on February 6, 2003.

At the time of his arrest, Bandak was described as the only Christian in the entire Al-Aqsa Martyrs' Brigades. However, during a meeting with Bandak's family in 2009, Palestinian Authority official Issa Qaraqe hinted that there were other imprisoned Christian militants as well. The only other known Christian from the Al-Aqsa Martyrs' Brigades was Daniel Saba George ("Abu Hamama"), a senior Tanzim operative killed by Israel in 2006.

Bandak was released in 2011 as part of an exchange for the release of Israeli soldier Gilad Shalit and later deported to the Gaza Strip.

== See also ==
- List of Arab–Israeli prisoner exchanges
- List of Palestinian Christians
- List of prisoners released by Israel in the Gilad Shalit prisoner exchange
- Palestinian right of armed resistance
