= Ameer Makhoul =

Palestinian Christian citizen of Israel convicted of espionage

- أمير مخول
- Born: 19 June 1958 (age 67); Haifa, Israel
- Occupation: Human rights activist

Ameer Makhoul (Arabic: أمير مخول, Hebrew: אמיר מח'ול; born 19 June 1958) is a Palestinian Christian citizen of Israel and the director of the Haifa-based Ittijah, the Union of Arab Community-Based Associations.

In 2010, Makhoul was arrested by the Shin Bet on charges of espionage. He was sentenced based on his own confession, a confession which was allegedly obtained under torture.

Makhoul was released in 2019.

== Personal life ==
Makhoul is married to Janan Abdu, herself a noted Palestinian human rights activist. Together they have two daughters. His brother, Issam Makhoul has served as a member of the Knesset for Hadash between 1999 and 2006.

== Arrest ==
In April 2010, a no-exit order preventing Makhoul from leaving the country was imposed. Two weeks later, Makhoul and fellow activist Omar Sayid, an Israeli Arab pharmacist, were arrested on charges of spying for Hezbollah. His arrest was also placed under a gag order an Israeli court at the request of the Shin Bet. According to the Shin Bet, Makhoul met with a known Hezbollah agent during visits to Arab countries, and was recruited to spy against Israel. A week after Makhoul's arrest, the judge in the case allowed the partial lifting of the gag order so the media could name the accused.

According to a 2010 indictment, as reported in Haaretz, both Makhoul and Sayid were recruited as spies for Hezbollah by Hassan Jaja, who is described as an agent of the organization operating in Jordan. The indictment states that in 2008 Makhoul met with a second, unnamed Hezbollah member in Denmark, introduced by Jaja. He agreed to provide information to the organization and point out potential recruits, and received encryption software as a means of communication. Makhoul then proceeded to provide his handler with the names of six potential recruits, all of which were later investigated by the Shin Bet and released without charge. Makhoul was asked to report on the exact locations of the Shin Bet installations inside Israel as well as their security arrangements. The details of two such locations were passed to his Hezbollah handlers, according to the indictment. Makhoul was instructed to provide information regarding the locations of other security and government installations, as well as the homes of prominent politicians and security personnel. In addition he was asked to record the locations of rocket strikes during the Second Lebanon War, and to pass his observations regarding Israeli public opinion on various topics. The indictment alleges that Makhoul carried out surveillance of at least one IDF base, in the vicinity of Nachshonim. He also described to his handlers the vulnerability of the Israeli civilian population as a weak point.

== Denial of charges ==
On reading the Haaretz report, Jaja's wife, Razan Zuayter, wrote a letter to the Jordanian newspaper Alghad, in which she denied the charge that her husband had any affiliation with Hezbollah. She suggested that this is an attempt to prevent contacts between Israeli Palestinians living within the Green Line and those in the Palestinian diaspora.

== Plea bargain ==
In October 2010, Makhoul admitted to contacting a foreign agent, conspiring to assisting an enemy in a time of war, and aggravated espionage for Hezbollah, as part of a plea bargain. The most serious charge, "assisting an enemy in war", which could have carried a life sentence, was dropped by the prosecution as a result of the bargain.

== Conviction and sentencing ==
In January 2011, the Haifa District Court convicted Makhoul of spying and of contact with a foreign agent of Hezbollah. He received a nine-year prison sentence, with an additional year suspended sentence.

== Reactions ==
Amnesty International described the conviction as "very disturbing development", called on the Israeli authorities to end what they described as "harassment of Palestinian human rights activists" and said that they were "extremely concerned by allegations that he was tortured and otherwise ill-treated following his arrest".
