= Hanna Musleh =

Hanna Musleh is a Palestinian film maker and university professor.

== Studies ==
Musleh was born in 1954 in Beit Jala to Wahbe and Nijmeh Musleh where he attended the Mennonite School. He studied at Leningrad State University in Russia for a degree in anthropology and Manchester University in England afterwards. Since 1980 he has worked as a professor at Bethlehem University teaching cultural studies, history, anthropology film appreciation, religion and philosophy where he remains with his Russian wife Lilia and their son Alexander.

== Filmography ==
- Sahar’s Wedding (1991) - a wedding in Al-Khader, a small village outside of Bethlehem under Israeli occupation during the first Intifada.
- International Centre of Bethlehem (ICB) debate TV show series - chronicles Palestinian self-determination, physically disabled Palestinians, Palestinian suffering, emotional Palestinian biographies, individual Palestinian despair, Palestinian elections, Palestinian health, Palestinian water deficiency
- Cairo International Festival for Children’s Cinema - the life of Palestinian children who suffered permanent disabilities in the ongoing violence in the Holy Land: awarded with the Golden Award for a Short Film.
- We are God’s Soldiers - two brothers, one supporting Fatah, the other Hamas
- Palestinian Sign Language - Palestinian kids with special needs
- I Am a Little Angel - Palestinian girls going through Israeli checkpoints
- In the Spider’s Web
- Walling In Walling Out: A Bethlehem Story.

== See also ==
- Raymonda Tawil
