= Ittijah =

Israeli network for Palestinian non-governmental organizations

Ittijah or "Union of Arab Community-Based Associations" is a network for Palestinian non-governmental organizations (NGOs) founded in 1995 in Israel. The organization's stated goals are promoting the Palestinian Arab civil society and advocating political, economic and social change for Palestinians who are denied access to infrastructure and services "due to discriminatory practices and policies of the (Israeli) State". Based in Haifa, the focus is on coordinating the activities and strategies of member organisations while promoting advocacy, capacity building and networking.

Ittijah's advocacy focuses on raising awareness about the social, political and economic needs of Palestinian Arabs at the (inter-Palestinian), region (Arab) and international levels. Advocacy is directed at governments, civil society groups, donor agencies, other indigenous peoples and human rights agencies, unions, and Palestinian solidarity groups. Ittijah hosts regular Ambassadorial study days and solidarity delegations, produces fact sheet publications, and arranges conferences and meetings.

Ittijah's capacity building efforts are aimed at enhancing the human, technical, financial and educational resources of its member organizations. Ittijah places international volunteers with local organizations and provides translation assistance with English language correspondence.

Ittijah's networking efforts are engaged at the grassroots through international levels extending from field-based networking with women's and youth groups at the local level through regional inter-Arab and international levels. Particular attention is paid to developing a network of specialists engaged in building civil society infrastructure, communication and cooperation. Ittijah's helped create the "Youth Network," a collaboration between ten Community associations that participated in a one-year project with participating young Palestinians from different regions.

== Ameer Makhoul Arrest ==
In May, 2010, Ittijah's director, Ameer Makhoul was arrested by the Israeli Shin Bet and accused of meeting with a Hezbollah spy who recruited him to engage in espionage against Israel. An Israeli court sealed his arrest under gag order at the request of the security services. Neither his name nor his detention could be reported in the Israeli media. Nevertheless, an Israeli online news outlet and foreign blog did break the gag and report his identity. Jaja reportedly helped Ittijah purchase the building housing its offices.

Makhoul later admitted to spying for Hezbollah, as part of a plea bargain. The Haifa District Court sentenced Makhoul in January 2011 to "nine years in prison and another year suspended sentence for charges of spying and contact with a foreign agent from the Lebanon-based Hezbollah militant organization."

== See also ==
- Abnaa el-Balad
