= Palestinian Christians =

Religious minority of the Palestinian people

Palestinian Christians المسيحيون الفلسطينيون
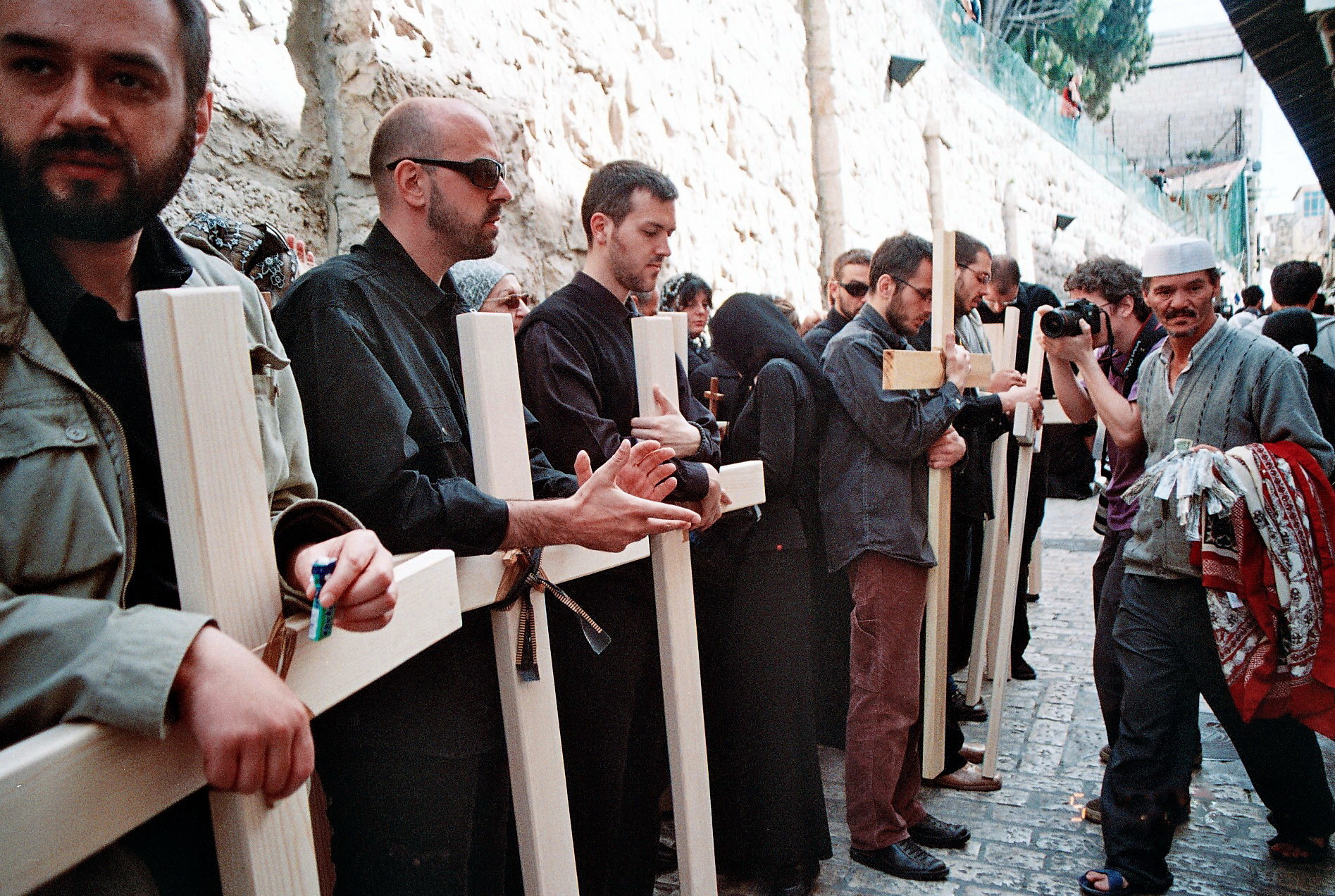
- Palestinian Christians in the Christian Quarter of Jerusalem, Holy Land

Total population
- ~500,000 (~6.5% of the global Palestinian population) (1990s–2000s estimate)

Regions with significant populations
- (Palestine) Palestinian diaspora (~56%); Israel (~148,000) (Palestine) Occupied Palestinian Territory (~50,000)

Languages
- Palestinian Arabic

Palestinian Christians (Arabic: مَسِيحِيُّون فِلَسْطِينِيُّون, romanized: Masīḥiyyūn Filasṭīniyyūn) are a religious community of the Palestinian people consisting of those who identify as Christians, including those who are cultural Christians in addition to those who actively adhere to Christianity. They are a religious minority within Palestine and Israel, as well as within the Palestinian diaspora. Applying the broader definition, which groups together individuals with full or partial Palestinian Christian ancestry, the term was applied to an estimated 500,000 people globally in the year 2000. As most Palestinians are Arabs, the overwhelming majority of Palestinian Christians also identify as Arab Christians.

Most Palestinian Christians belong to one of a number of Christian denominations, including Eastern Orthodoxy, Oriental Orthodoxy, Catholicism (both the Latin Church and the Eastern Catholic Churches), Anglicanism, and Protestantism (such as Lutheranism), among others. In the 1990s, an estimate by Professor Bernard Sabella of Bethlehem University postulated that approximately 6.5% of the global Palestinian population was Christian, and that 56% of this figure was living outside of Palestine and Israel.

As of 2015, Palestinian Christians comprise between 1% and 2.5% of the population of the West Bank, and about 3,000 (0.13%) of the population of the Gaza Strip. According to official British Mandate statistics, Christians accounted for 9.5% of the total population (and 10.8% of Palestine's Arabs) in 1922 and 7.9% of the total population in 1946. Over the course of the 1947–1949 Palestine war between the Palestinian Arabs and the Palestinian Jews, a large number of these Christians—as part of the Arab community—fled or were expelled by Jewish militias from what would become recognized as Israeli territory following the 1949 Armistice Agreements. Since the 1967 Arab–Israeli War, which resulted in Israel's occupation of the Palestinian territories (the Jordanian-annexed West Bank and the Egyptian-occupied Gaza Strip), the Palestinian Christian population has increased as a whole, but has decreased as a percentage of the total Palestinian population.

Many individuals of the Palestinian diaspora who identify as Christians are descendants of the post-1948 Palestinian Christian refugees who fled from the Arab–Israeli conflict and settled in Christian-majority countries.

== Ethnic identity ==
Palestinian Christians of different denominations are united by a common ethnic and Christian identity, as well as the experience of a connection to the birthplace of Christianity and a role in caring for its holy sites. Many Palestinian Christians are descended from early Christians, and they have sometimes called themselves "living stones" (al-hijara al-hayya), drawing on the biblical passage of 1 Peter 2:5. Although religion is perceived as a partly divisive factor, the common Palestinian and Arab identity of Palestinian Christians is also shared with Palestinian Muslims.

That Christian Arabs in Palestine see themselves as Arab reflects also the fact that, as of the beginning of the twentieth century, they shared many of the same customs as their Muslim neighbors. In some respects, this was a consequence of Christians adopting what were essentially Islamic practices, many of which were derived of sharî'ah. In others, it was more the case that the customs shared by both Muslims and Christians derived from neither faith, but rather were a result of a process of syncretization, whereby what had once been pagan practices were later redefined as Christian and subsequently adopted by Muslims. This was especially evident in the fact that Palestine's Muslims and Christians shared many of the same feast days, in honor of the same saints, even if they referred to them by different names. "Shrines dedicated to St. George, for instance, were transformed into shrines honoring Khidr-Ilyas, a conflation of the Prophet Elijah and the mythical sprite Khidr". Added to this, many Muslims viewed local Christian churches as saints' shrines. Thus, for instance, "Muslim women having difficulties conceiving, for instance, might travel to Bethlehem to pray for a child before the Virgin Mary". It was even not uncommon for a Muslim to have his child baptized in a Christian church, in the name of Khaḍr.

== Geographic distribution ==
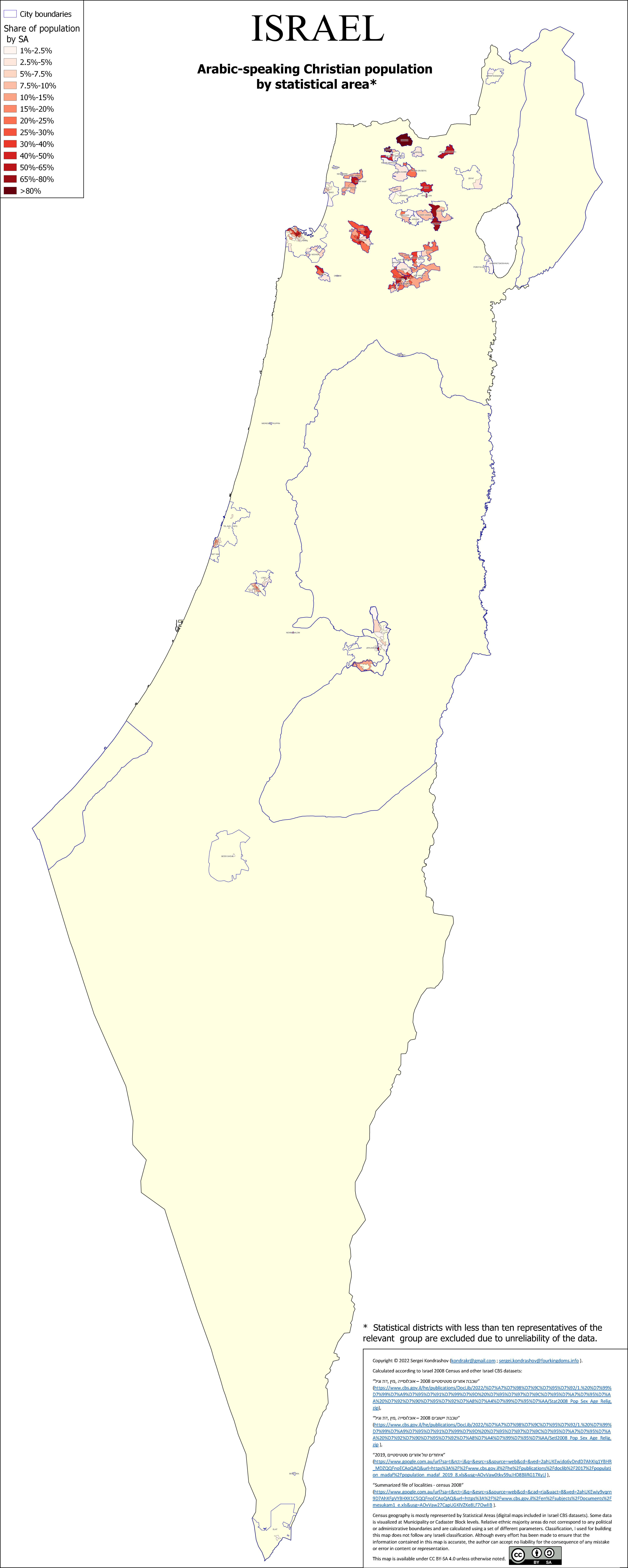
Distribution of Palestinian Christians the Holy Land.

=== Diaspora ===
The majority (56%) of Palestinian Christians live in the Palestinian diaspora.

=== Israel ===
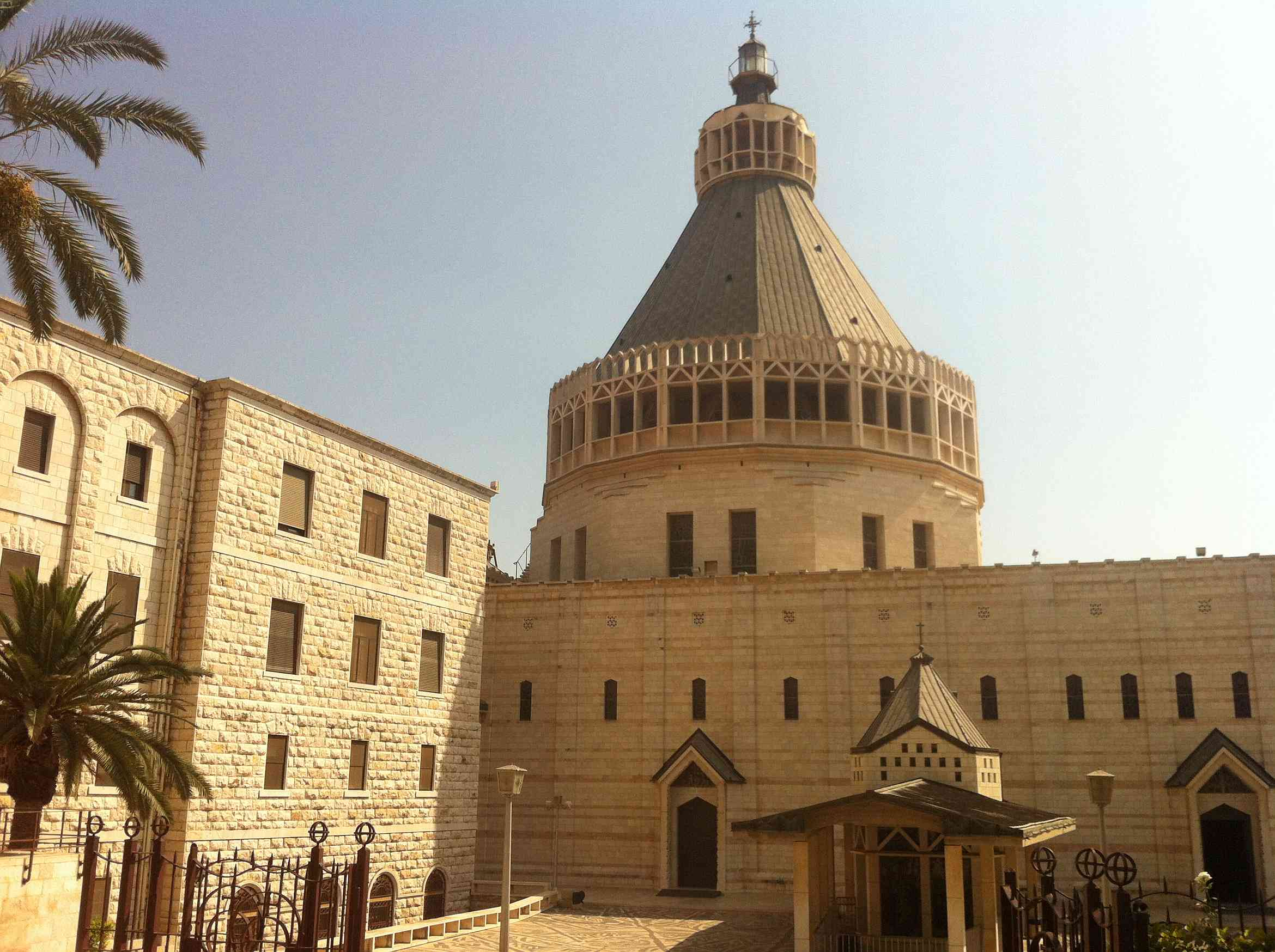
The Basilica of the Annunciation in Nazareth, Israel.

Of the total Christian population of 185,000 in Israel, about 80% are designated as Arabs, many of whom self-identify as Palestinian.

In 2024, according to the Israel Central Bureau of Statistics, there were 180,300 Christians in Israel (including East Jerusalem), of which c.141,900 (79%) are Arab Christians (Palestinian Christians) living in the Northern District (68%, c.96,500), Haifa District (15%, c.21,300) and other areas (17%), with 44% in just three locations: Nazareth and Nof HaGalil (30,300 combined), Haifa (18,700) and Jerusalem (13,100). The c.38,400 non-Arab Christians live mainly in the Tel Aviv District and Central District (41% combined), and in the Northern and Haifa Districts (35% combined).

=== Palestine ===
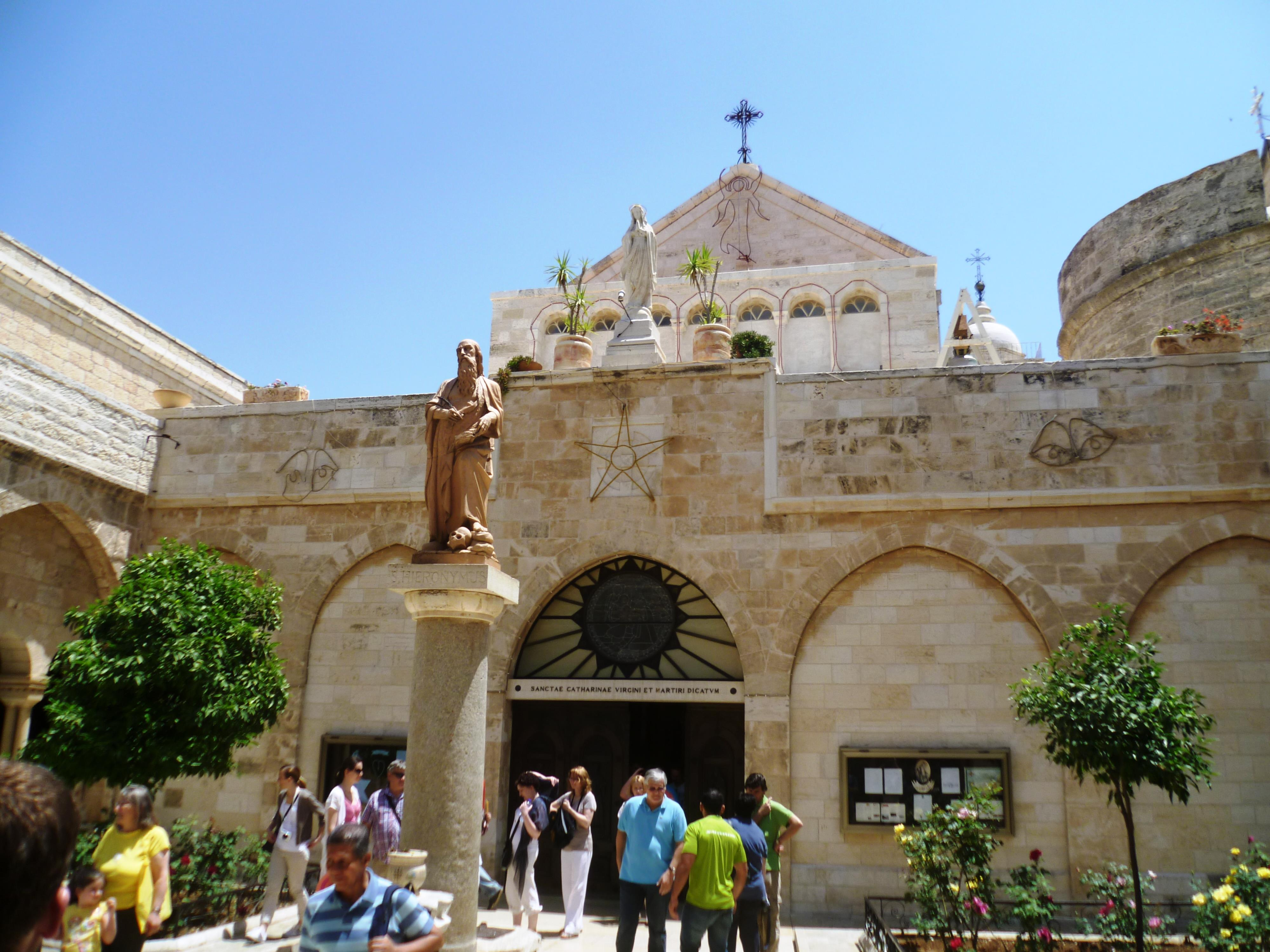
The Church of Saint Catherine in Bethlehem, Palestine.

In 2009, there were an estimated 50,000 Christians in the Palestinian territories, mostly in the West Bank, with about 3,000 in the Gaza Strip. In 2022, about 1,100 Christians lived in the Gaza Strip – down from over 1300 in 2014. About 80% of the Christian Palestinians live in an urban environment. In the West Bank, they are concentrated mostly in Jerusalem and its vicinity: Bethlehem, Beit Jala, Beit Sahour, Ramallah, Bir Zayt, Jifna, Ein Arik, Taybeh.

In 2017, the most recent census by the Palestinian Central Bureau of Statistics, there were 46,850 Christians in the Palestinian territories, the vast majority living in the West Bank, which accounted for 45,712 Christians (c.98%), while the Gaza Strip was home to just 1,138 Christians (c.2%). Christian communities in the West Bank were highly concentrated, with nearly three-quarters living in three governorates: the Bethlehem Governorate (23,165; 51%), the Ramallah & Al-Bireh Governorate (10,255; 22%), and the Jerusalem Governorate (8,558; 19%). Smaller Christian populations were present in the Jenin Governorate (2,699), the Nablus Governorate (601), the Jericho & Al-Aghwar Governorate (285), and other governorates, each accounting for less than 2% of the total. In the Gaza Strip, Christians were concentrated primarily in the Gaza Governorate (1,082; 95%), with very small communities in the North Gaza, Khan Yunis, Rafah, and Deir Al-Balah Governorates.

Governorate	Christians	%
Bethlehem	23,165	11%
Ramallah & Al-Bireh	10,255	3%
Jerusalem	8,558	2%
Jenin	2,699	1%
Nablus	601	0.2%
Jericho & Al-Aghwar	285	1%
Hebron	59	0.01%
Tubas and the Northern Valleys	54	0.1%
Tulkarm	21	0.01%
Qalqiliya	11	0.01%
Salfit	4	0.01%
Total West Bank	45,712	2%
Gaza	1,082	0.2%
North Gaza	20	0.01%
Khan Yunis	16	0.004%
Rafah	12	0.01%
Deir Al-Balah	8	0.003%
Total Gaza Strip	1,138	0.1%
Total	46,850	1%

== Demographics and denominations ==
=== 1922 census ===
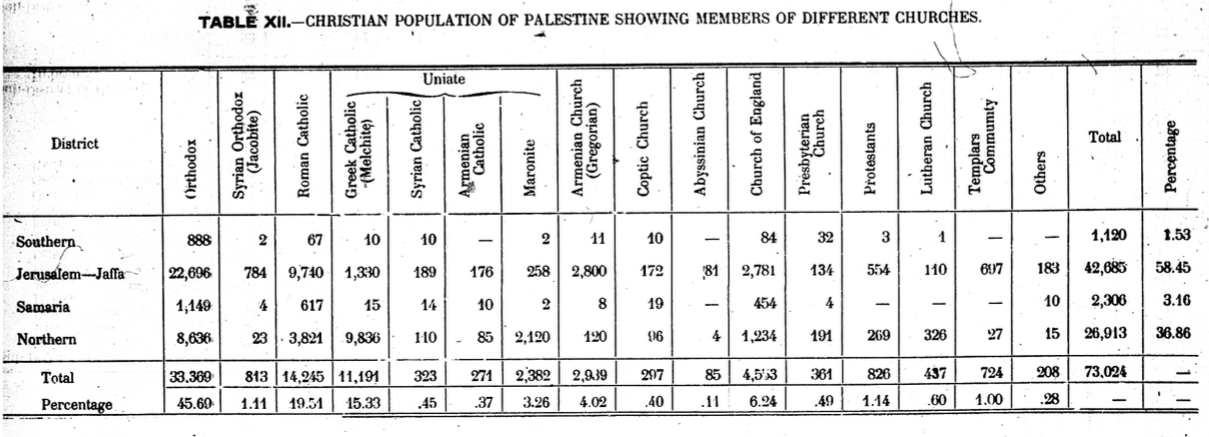
Christian sects in Palestine from the 1922 census of Palestine

In the 1922 census of Palestine there were approximately 73,000 Christian Palestinians: 46% Orthodox, 40% Catholic (20% Latin Catholic, and 20% Eastern Catholic).

The census recorded over 200 localities with a Christian population. The totals by denomination for all of Mandatory Palestine were: Greek Orthodox 33,369, Syriac Orthodox (Jacobite) 813, Latin Catholic 14,245, Greek Catholic (Melkite) 11,191, Syriac Catholic 323, Armenian Catholic 271, Maronite 2,382, Armenian Orthodox (Gregorian) 2,939, Coptic Church 297, Abyssinian Church 85, Church of England 4,553, Presbyterian Church 361, Protestants 826, Lutheran Church 437, Templars Community 724, others 208.

The census also listed 10,707 Palestinian Christians living abroad, making up the largest portion of the Palestinians living abroad at the time: 32 in Australia, 17 in Africa, 1 in Austria, 1 in Belgium, 1 in Bulgaria, 2 in Canada, 242 in Egypt, 34 in France, 59 in Germany, 1 in Greece, 7 in Italy, 4 in Morocco, 1 in Mesopotamia, 1 in Paraguay, 5 in Persia, 4 in Russia, 1 in South Africa, 11 in East Africa, 7 in Sudan, 6 in Sweden, 1 in Switzerland, 2 in Spain, 122 in Syria, 95 in Transjordan, 8,517 in South and Central American republics, 17 in Turkey, 6 in the United Kingdom, 1,352 in the United States, and 158 whose locations were unknown.

=== Denominations ===
Around 50% of Palestinian Christians belong to the Greek Orthodox Church of Jerusalem, one of the 15 churches of Eastern Orthodoxy. There are also Catholics (Melkites, Latins, Maronites), Oriental Orthodox (Armenians, Jacobites, Copts), Protestants (Anglicans, Lutherans, others), and Jehovah's Witnesses. There is a Quaker congregation in Ramallah.

=== Church leadership ===
Patriarch Theophilos III is the leader of the Greek Orthodox Church of Jerusalem since 2005. He replaced Irenaios (in office from 2001), who was deposed by the church synod after a term surrounded by controversy and scandal over a sale of property owned by the Greek Orthodox Church to Jewish investors. The Israel government initially refused to recognize Theophilos's appointment but finally granted full recognition in December 2007, despite a legal challenge by his predecessor Irenaios. Archbishop Theodosios (Hanna) of Sebastia the highest ranking Palestinian clergyman in the Greek Orthodox Patriarchate of Jerusalem.

The Latin Patriarch of Jerusalem is the leader of the Latin Catholics in Jerusalem, Palestine, Jordan, Israel and Cyprus. The office has been held by Pierbattista Pizzaballa since his appointment by Pope Francis on 6 November 2020. George Bacouni, of the Melkite Greek Catholic Church, is Archbishop of Akka, with jurisdiction over Haifa, Acre and the Galilee, and replaced Elias Chacour, a Palestinian refugee, in 2014. Moussa El-Hage, of the Maronite Church, is since 2012 simultaneously Archbishop of the Archeparchy of Haifa and the Holy Land and Patriarchal Exarch of Jerusalem and Palestine.

The Anglican Bishop in Jerusalem is Suheil Dawani, who replaced Bishop Riah Abou Al Assal. Bishop Dr. Munib Younan is the president of the Lutheran World Federation and the Bishop of the Evangelical Lutheran Church in Jordan and the Holy Land (ELCJHL).

==== International Christian Organisations in Palestine ====
Various international Christian organisations provide services in Palestine to Palestinians of all religious backgrounds.

- YMCA in Gaza and Jerusalem
- The Anglican Church runs the Al-Ahli Arab Hospital

==== Christian development assistance ====
A study showed $416 million annual spending of Christian institutions on Palestinian society, in sectors such as health care, education, social services, vocational training and development assistance interventions in all Palestinian governorates.

== History ==
=== Background and early history ===
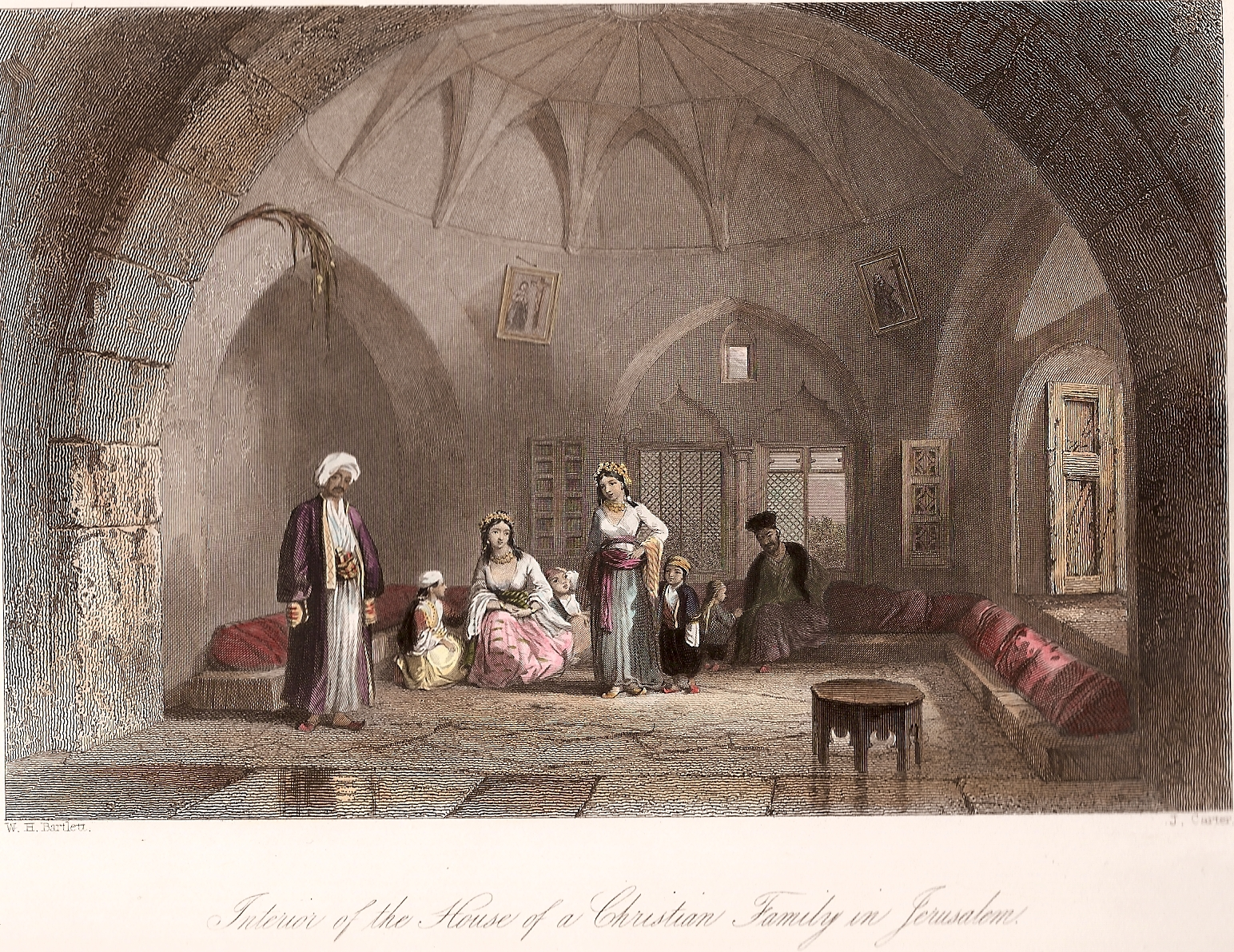
Interior of the house of a Christian family in Jerusalem. By W. H. Bartlett, c. 1850

Map of the Kingdom of Jerusalem and other Crusader states in 1135.

The first Christian communities in Roman Judea originated from the followers of Jesus of Nazareth, who was put to death and crucified by order of the Prefect Pontius Pilate in 30–33; they were Aramaic speaking Jewish Christian and, later, Latin and Greek-speaking Romans and Greeks, who were in part descendants from previous settlers of the regions, such as Syro-Phoenicians, Arameans, Greeks, Persians, and Arabs such as Nabataeans.

Contrary to other groups of oriental Christians such as the largely Assyrian Nestorians, the vast majority of Palestinian Christians went under the ecclesiastical jurisdiction of the Ecumenical Patriarchate and Roman emperors after the Council of Chalcedon in 451 AD (which would be part of the Eastern Orthodox Church after the Great Schism), and were known by other Syrian Christians as Melkites (followers of the king). The Melkites were heavily Hellenised in the following centuries, abandoning their distinct Western Aramaic languages in favour of Greek. By the 7th century, Jerusalem, Gaza and Byzantine Palestine became the epicentre of Greek culture in the Orient.

In the fourth century, the monk Hilarion introduced monasticism in the area around Gaza which became a flourishing monastic center (including the Saint Hilarion Monastery and the monastery of Seridus), second only to the cluster of monasteries in the Judaean desert (which include the Mar Saba monastery).

Following Muslim conquests, non-Arabic speaking Christians underwent a gradual process of Arabization in which they abandoned Aramaic and Greek in favor of Arabic. Melkites, like for example Michael Synkellos, began abandoning Greek for Arabic, a process which made them the most Arabicised Christians in the Levant. Most Arab Ghassanids remained Christian and joined Melkite and Syriac communities within what is now Jordan, Israel, Palestine, Syria, and Lebanon.

The eleventh century Melkite bishop of Gaza Sulayman al-Ghazzi holds a unique place in the history of Arab Christian literature as author of the first diwan of Christian religious poetry in Arabic. His poems give insights into the life of Palestinian Christians and the persecution they suffered under Fatimid caliph al-Hakim.

In the late sixteenth century, Christianity in southern Bilad ash-Sham was primarily rural, with a significant portion of the population living in villages and tribes. Christians were dispersed among numerous towns and villages in the vicinity of Jerusalem, some had been inhabited by Christians since Byzantine and Frankish rule. Villages with Christian population included Taybeh, Beit Rima, Jifna an-Nasara, Ramallah, Yabrud, Aboud, Suba, Tuqu, Nahalin, and Artas. The Christians living in these villages were mainly of Greek Orthodox denomination, although exceptions existed, such as the Syrian Christian community in Aboud.

=== Modern history ===
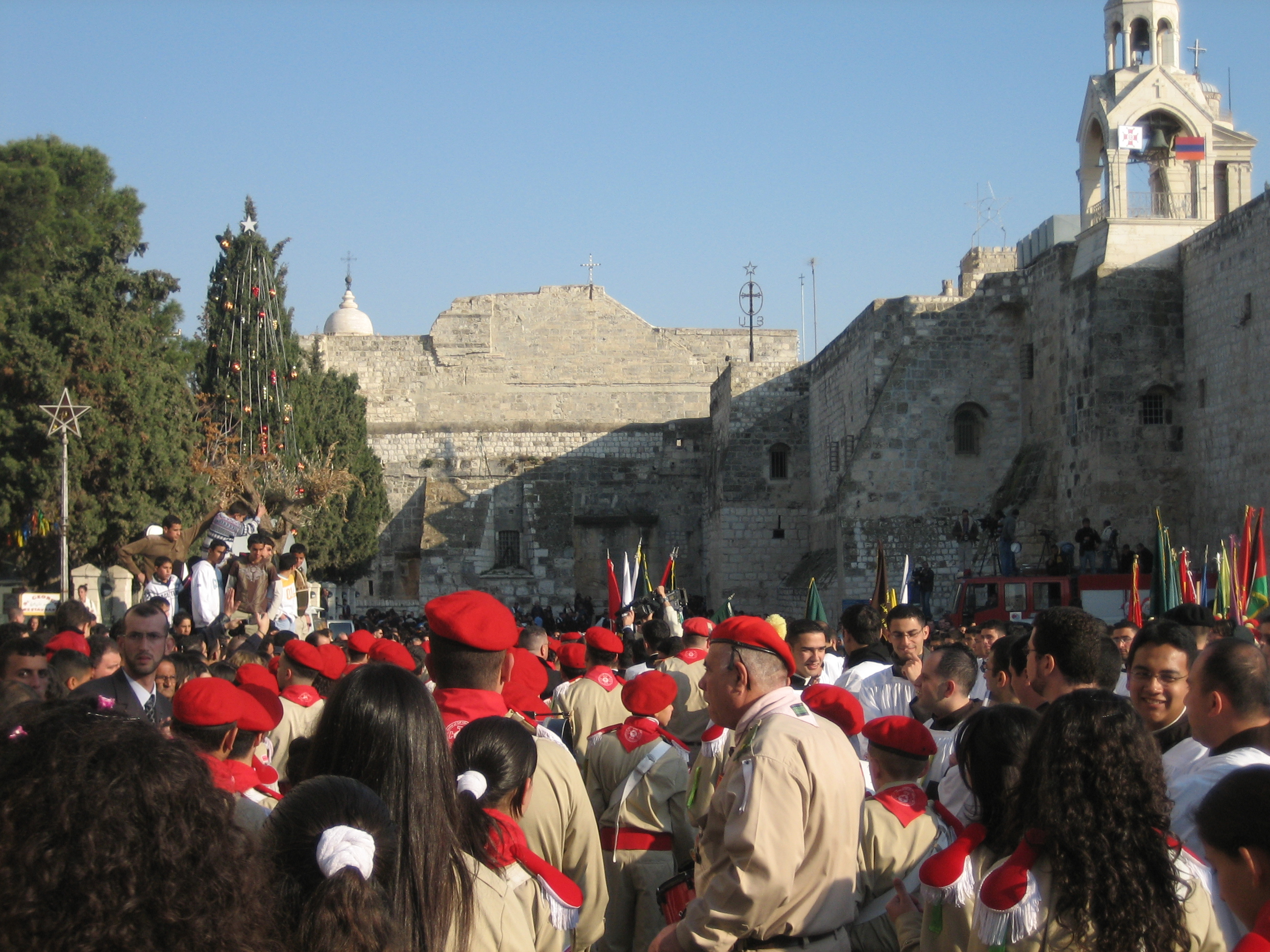
Palestinian Christian Scouts on Christmas Eve in front of the Nativity Church in Bethlehem (2006)

During the Ottoman Empire, foreign powers enjoyed positions of guardianship towards minorities, including the French for the Christians of Syria, Lebanon and Palestine. Orthodox Christians more specifically came under the protections of the Russian Empire. This placed Palestinian Christians with protection privileges, and access to missionary schools, which enabled them to engage in commerce with European traders. In addition, Christian merchants had lower rates of duty to pay than their Muslim counterparts, and thus they established themselves as bankers and moneylenders for Muslim landowners, artisans and peasants. This growing middle class produced several newspaper owners and editors and played leading roles in Palestinian political life.

The category of 'Palestinian Arab Christian' came to assume a political dimension in the 19th century as international interest grew and foreign institutions were developed there. The urban elite began to undertake the construction of a modern multi-religious Arab civil society. When the British received from the League of Nations a mandate to administer Palestine after World War I, many British dignitaries in London were surprised to discover so many Christian leaders in the Palestinian Arab political movements. The British authorities in the Mandate of Palestine had difficulty understanding the commitment of the Palestinian Christians to Palestinian nationalism.

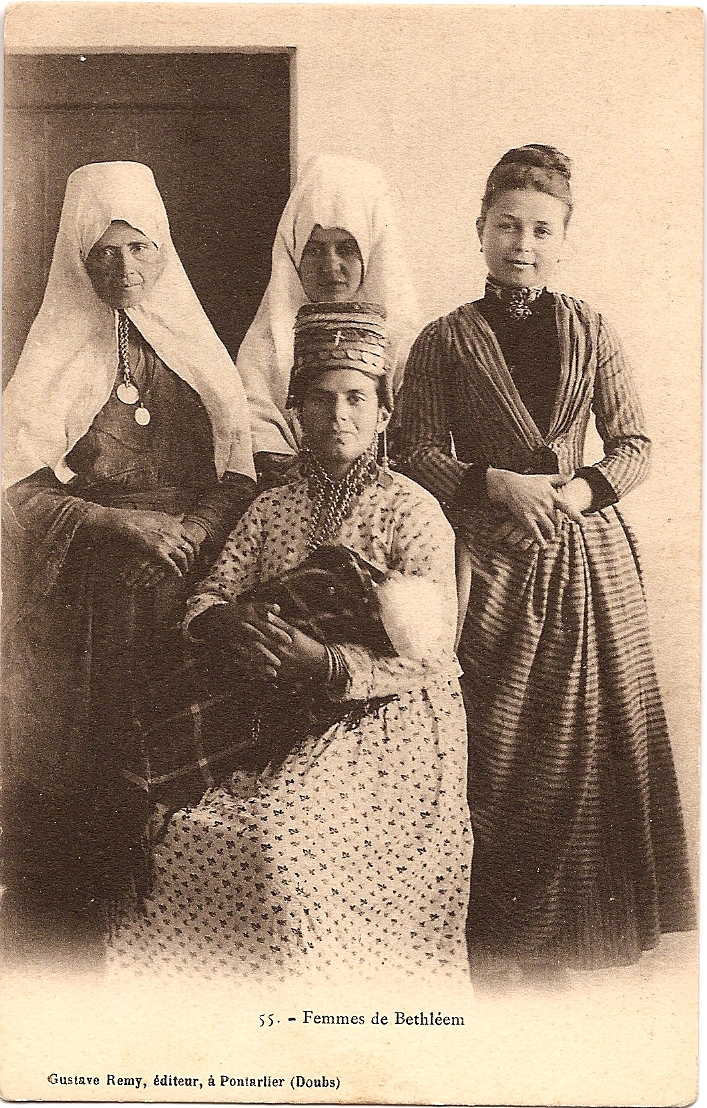
Four Bethlehemi Christian women, 1911

Palestinian Christian-owned Falastin was founded in 1911 in the then Arab-majority city of Jaffa. The newspaper is often described as one of the most influential newspapers in historic Palestine, and probably the nation's fiercest and most consistent critic of the Zionist movement. It helped shape Palestinian identity and nationalism and was shut down several times by the Ottoman and British authorities, most of the time due to complaints made by Zionists. Following the British takeover of Palestine in 1918 during the final stages of the First World War, groups called "Muslim-Christian Associations" were formed across the new Mandatory Palestine in order to oppose the Zionist movement and implementation of the Balfour Declaration. In the 1920s, it was noted that the inhabitants of Beit Kahil, Dayr Aban and Taffuh were originally Christian.

The 1948 Palestinian expulsion and flight– the foundational events of the Nakba– left the multi-denominational Christian Arab communities in disarray. They had little background in theology, their work being predominantly pastoral, and their immediate task was to assist the thousands of homeless refugees. But it also sowed the seeds for the development of a Liberation Theology among Palestinian Arab Christians.

There was a differential policy of expulsion. More lenience was applied to the Christians of the Galilee where expulsion mostly affected Muslims: at Tarshiha, Me'eliya, Dayr al-Qassi, and Salaban, Christians were allowed to remain while Muslims were driven out. At Iqrit and Bir'im the Israel Defense Forces (IDF) ordered Christians to evacuate for a brief spell, an order that was then confirmed as a permanent expulsion. Sometimes in a mixed Druze-Christian village like al-Rama, only the Christians were initially expelled towards Lebanon, but, thanks to the intervention of the local Druze, they were permitted to return. The IDF carried out massacres of Christians at the villages of Eilabun and Al-Bassa. Nazareth, at that time a town with a Christian majority, was spared devastation after agreeing to halt resistance and surrender, and because Israel did not want to visibly provoke an outcry in the Christian world. Important Christian figures were sometimes allowed to return, on condition they help Israel among their communities. Archbishop Hakim, with many hundreds of Christians, was allowed reentry on expressing a willingness to campaign against Communists in Israel and among his flock.

After the war of 1948, the Christian population in the West Bank, under Jordanian control, dropped slightly, largely due to economic problems. This contrasts with the process occurring in Israel where Christians left en masse after 1948. Constituting 21% of Israel's Arab population in 1950, they now make up just 9% of that group. These trends accelerated after the 1967 war in the aftermath of Israel's takeover of the West Bank and Gaza.

=== In the Palestinian Authority (from 1994) ===
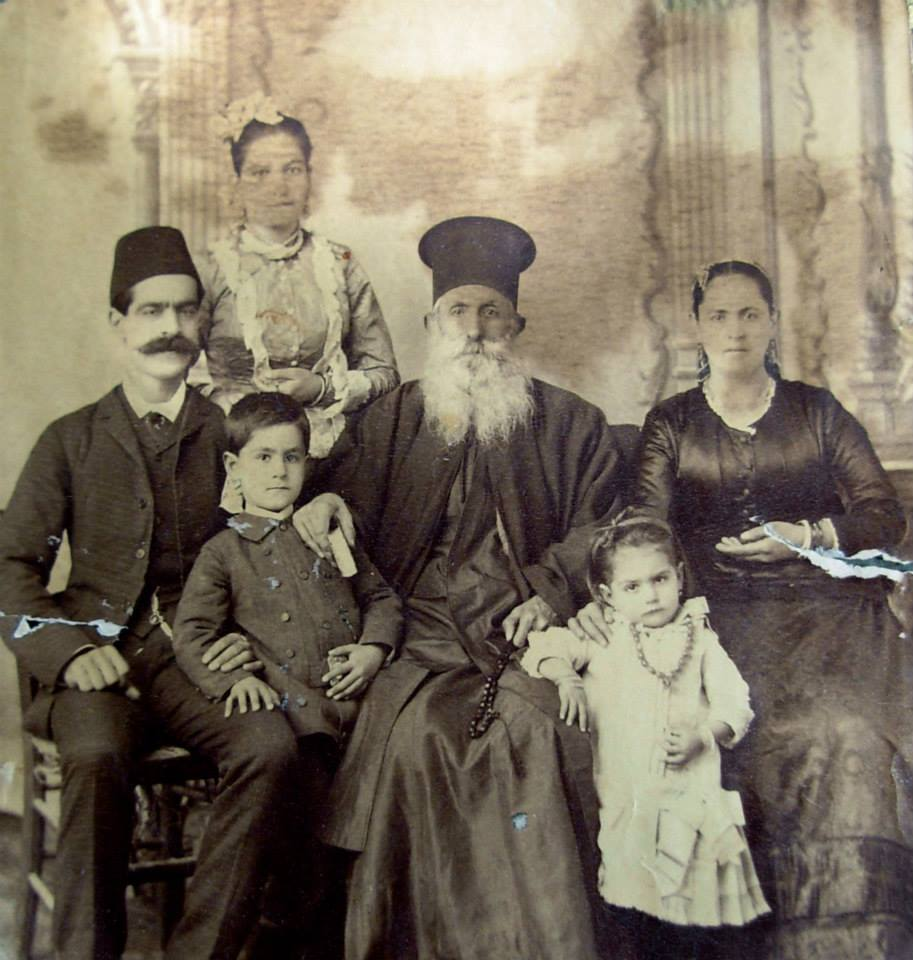
Married Eastern Orthodox priest from Jerusalem with his family (three generations), c. 1893

Christians within the Palestinian Authority constituted around one in seventy-five residents. In 2009, Reuters reported that 47,000–50,000 Christians remained in the West Bank, with around 17,000 following the various Catholic traditions and most of the rest following the Orthodox church and other eastern denominations. Both Bethlehem and Nazareth, which were once overwhelmingly Christian, now have Muslim majorities. Today about three-quarters of all Bethlehem Christians live abroad, and more Jerusalem Christians live in Sydney, Australia, than in Jerusalem. Christians now comprise 2.5 percent of the population of Jerusalem. Those remaining include a few born in the Old City when Christians there constituted a majority.

In a 2007 letter from Congressman Henry Hyde to President George W. Bush, Hyde stated that "the Christian community is being crushed in the mill of the bitter Israeli-Palestinian conflict" and that expanding Jewish settlements in the West Bank, including East Jerusalem, were "irreversibly damaging the dwindling Christian community".

In November 2009, Berlanty Azzam, a Palestinian Christian student from Gaza, was expelled from Bethlehem and was not allowed to continue her studying. She had two months left for the completion of her degree. Berlanty Azzam said the Israeli military handcuffed her, blindfolded her, and left her waiting for hours at a checkpoint on her way back from a job interview in Ramallah. She described the incident as "frightening" and claimed Israeli official treated her like a criminal and denied her an education because she is a Palestinian Christian from Gaza.

On 22 December 2025, a Christmas tree and a nativity scene were burned at Jenin's Holy Redeemer Church, attributed to Palestinian Muslim extremists.

=== In Israel ===
In July 2014, during operation Protective Edge an Israeli-Arab Christian demonstration was held in Haifa in a protest against Muslim extremism in the Middle East (concerning the rise of the Islamic State) and in support of Israel and the IDF.

Christian Arabs are one of the most educated groups in Israel. Statistically, Christian Arabs in Israel have the highest rates of educational attainment among all religious communities, according to a data by Israel Central Bureau of Statistics in 2010, 63% of Israeli Christian Arabs have had college or postgraduate education, the highest of any religious and ethno-religious group. Despite the fact that Arab Christians only represent 2.1% of the total Israeli population, in 2014 they accounted for 17.0% of the country's university students, and for 14.4% of its college students. Christians are proportionally more likely to have attained a bachelor's or higher academic degrees than the Israeli national average. Christian Arabs additionally have one of the highest rates of success in the matriculation examinations, (73.9%) in 2017 both in comparison to the Muslims and the Druze and in comparison to all students in the Jewish education system as a group. Arab Christians were also the vanguard in terms of eligibility for higher education, and they have attained a bachelor's degree and academic degree more than the median Israeli population. Christians schools in Israel went on strike in 2015 at the beginning of the 2015 academic year in protest at budget cuts aimed at them. The strike affected 33,000 pupils, 40 percent of them Muslim. In 2013, Israel covered 65% of the budget of Palestinian Christian schools in Israel, a figure cut that year to 34%. Christians say they now received a third of what Jewish schools receive, with a shortfall of $53 million.

The rate of students studying in the field of medicine was also higher among the Christian Arab students, compared with all the students from other sectors. The percentage of Arab Christian women who are higher education students is higher than other sectors.

In September 2014, Israel's interior minister signed an order that the self-identified ''Aramean Christian'' minority in Israel could register as Arameans rather than Arabs. The order will affect about 200 families.

The first local woman cleric ordained in the Holy Land was Palestinian Sally Azar of the Lutheran church in 2023.

=== Gaza war (2023–present) ===
Since the start of the ongoing Gaza war in October 2023, there have been several incidents involving Palestinian Christians in the Gaza Strip, most notably the Church of Saint Porphyrius airstrike and the killing of two Catholic women by an Israeli sniper in the Holy Family Parish in northern Gaza.

Meanwhile, in the West Bank, there is an ongoing struggle between the Christian Kisiya family and Israeli settlers attempting to confiscate their land in Beit Jala since July 2024. Another flashpoint was the June 2025 Israeli settler attack on the Christian village of Taybeh. In July 2025, Israeli forces once again targeted the Holy Family Church in Gaza City which resulted in two deaths.

== Political and ecumenical issues ==
The mayors of Ramallah, Birzeit, Bethlehem, Zababdeh, Jifna, Ein 'Arik, Aboud, Taybeh, Beit Jala and Beit Sahour are Christians. The Governor of Tubas, Marwan Tubassi, is a Christian. The former Palestinian representative to the United States, Afif Saffieh, is a Christian, as is the ambassador of the Palestinian Authority in France, Hind Khoury. The Palestinian women's football team has a majority of Muslim girls, but the captain, Honey Thaljieh, is a Christian from Bethlehem. Many of the Palestinian officials such as ministers, advisers, ambassadors, consulates, heads of missions, PLC, PNA, PLO, Fateh leaders and others are Christians. Some Christians were part of the affluent segments of Palestinian society that left the country during the 1948 Arab–Israeli War. In West Jerusalem, over 50% of Christian Palestinians lost their homes to the Israelis, according to the historian Sami Hadawi.

=== Involvement in Palestinian militancy ===
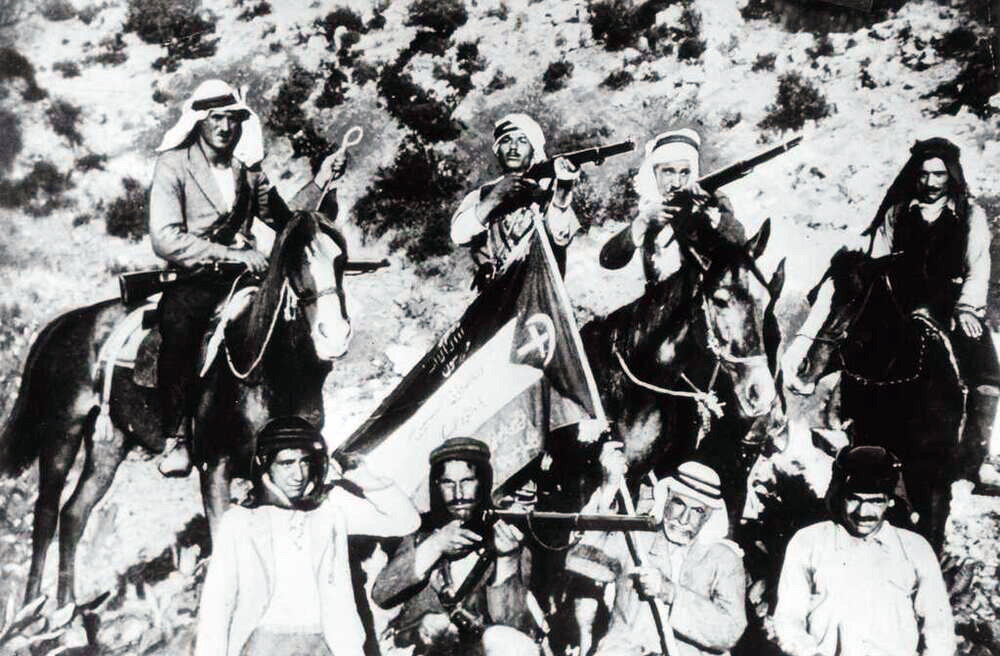
Palestinian rebels during the 1936-1939 revolt carrying a flag with a cross and crescent

Palestinian Christians have played a role in the anti-Zionist movement and related political violence, both before and after the establishment of Israel in 1948.

Four out of the 282 Palestinian Arab rebel leaders that participated in the 1936-1939 revolt in British Palestine were Christians. The rebels bore flags with a cross and crescent, symbolizing Christianity and Islam, respectively.

The Popular Front for the Liberation of Palestine (PFLP) was founded in 1967 by George Habash, a Christian. Habash once stated that he believed there was perfect harmony between his Christian religion, his Arab nationalism, his Islamic culture, and his Marxist politics. Wadie Haddad, the leader of the military wing of the PFLP, was also Christian. Reportedly, Eastern Orthodox priests would bless PFLP hijacking teams before they set out on attacks.

Sirhan Sirhan, who assassinated Robert F. Kennedy in 1968, came from a Christian family and later changed church denominations several times, joining Baptist and Seventh-day Adventist churches. However, in 1966, he joined the esoteric organization Ancient Mystical Order of the Rose Cross, one of the Rosicrucian Orders.

Luttif Afif, the commander of the Black September Organization (BSO) unit that carried out the 1972 Munich massacre, was reported to have at least a partial Christian background. He used the alias "Jesus", and named the Munich operation "Iqrit and Biram", after two Christian villages whose inhabitants were expelled by the IDF during the 1948 Arab–Israeli War. Theresa Halaseh, another member of the BSO, was a Christian and also a Fatah member. She participated in the BSO hijacking of Sabena Flight 571, and was captured but later released in a 1983 prisoner exchange.

During the Lebanese Civil War (1975–1990), the Palestinian National Salvation Front (PNSF), a Syrian proxy which opposed the Palestine Liberation Organization (PLO), had its headquarters in Mar Elias, a Palestinian Christian refugee camp.

There have been at least two known Christian militants from the Al-Aqsa Martyrs' Brigades, Chris Bandak and Daniel Saba George, both from Bethlehem. Bandak was imprisoned by Israel for shooting at Israeli motorists during the Second Intifada, and at that time was described as the only Christian in the entire Al-Aqsa Martyrs' Brigades. However, during a meeting with Bandak's family in 2009, Palestinian Authority official Issa Qaraqe hinted that there were other imprisoned Christian militants as well. Bandak was later released in 2011 as part of an exchange for the release of Israeli soldier Gilad Shalit. Daniel Saba George ("Abu Hamama"), who was also a senior Tanzim operative, was killed by Israel in 2006. An image was later taken of George's Christian funeral in Bethlehem, and a poster of him with Christian imagery was seen put up in the city that same year.

=== Arab Orthodox Movement ===
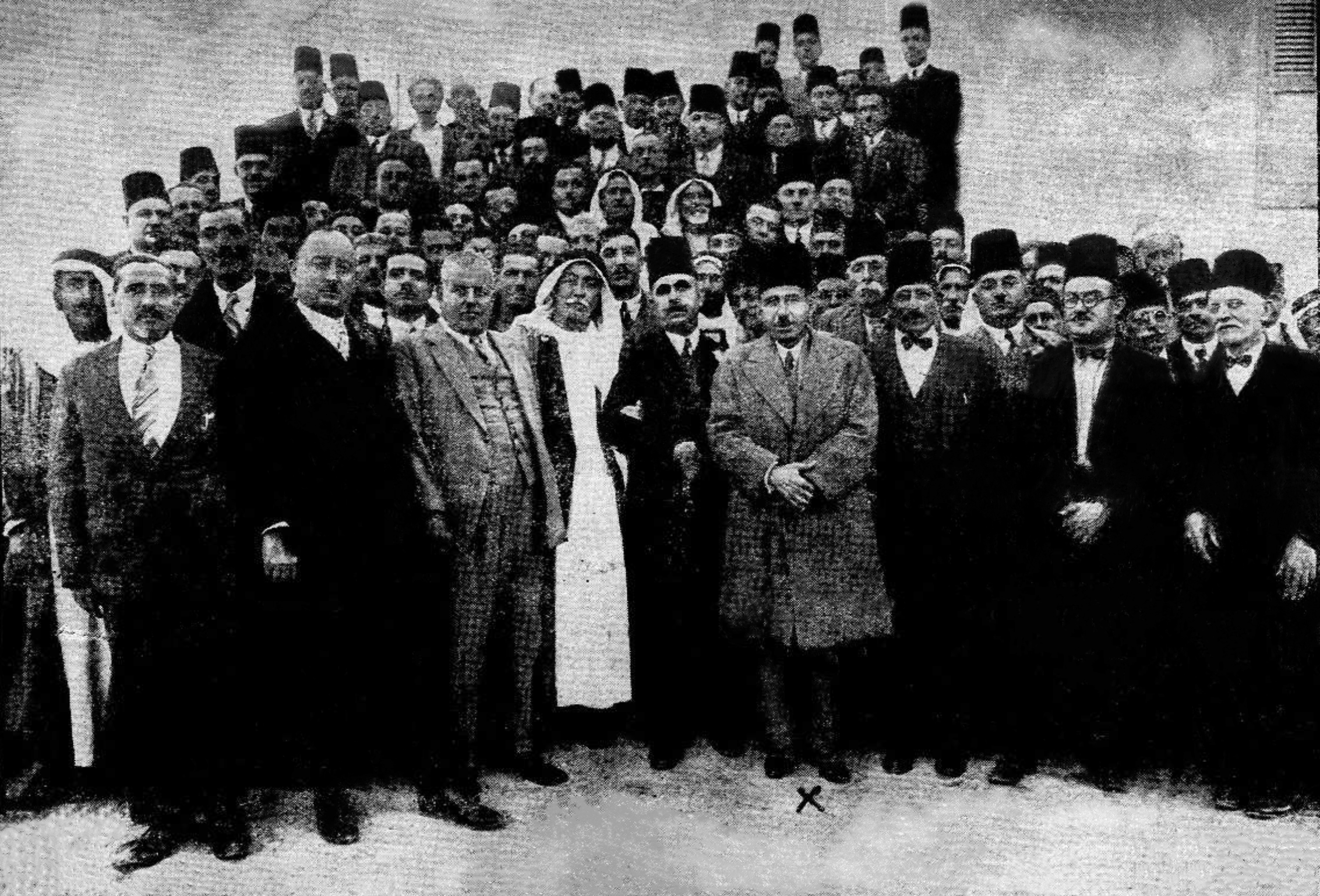
The Second Arab Orthodox Conference held in Jaffa, Mandatory Palestine, on 28 October 1931, with delegates from various Palestinian and Transjordanian cities.

The Arab Orthodox Movement is a political and social movement aiming for the Arabization of the Greek Orthodox Patriarchate of Jerusalem, the church overseeing Orthodox communities in Palestine, Israel and Jordan; to which the majority of the Christian population there belongs to.

Within the context of rising Arab nationalism in the 19th century, the movement was inspired by the successful precedent of the Arabization of Syria and Lebanon's Antioch Patriarchate in 1899. The movement seeks the appointment of an Arab patriarch, Arab laity control over Jerusalem patriarchate's properties for social and educational purposes, and the use of Arabic as a liturgical language. Initially a church movement among Palestine and Transjordan's Orthodox Arab Christians in the late 19th century, it was later supported as a Palestinian and Arab nationalist cause and championed by some Arab Muslims, owing to the Greek-dominated patriarchate's early support to Zionism.

The Orthodox laity, which is mostly Arab, maintains that the patriarchate was forcibly Hellenized in 1543, while the Greek clergy says that the patriarchate was historically Greek. Opposition to the Greek clergy turned violent in the late 19th century, when they came under physical attack by the Arab laity in the streets. The movement was subsequently focused on holding Arab Orthodox conferences, the first of which was held in Jaffa in 1923, and most recently in Amman in 2014. One outcome of the 1923 conference was the laity's establishment of tens of Orthodox churches, clubs and schools in Palestine and Jordan over the decades. There were historically also several interventions to solve the conflict by the Ottoman, British (1920–1948), and Jordanian (1948–1967) authorities, owing to the patriarchate's headquarters being located in East Jerusalem.

=== Christian converts from Islam ===
Though numbering only a few hundred, there is a community of Christians who have converted from Islam. They are not centered in one particular city and mostly belong to various evangelical and charismatic communities. These individuals tend to keep a low profile out of fear of persecution and intense stigma. The legality of conversion from Islam to Christianity under the Palestinian Authority is unclear.

=== Ecumenical Liberation Theology Center: Sabeel ===
The Sabeel Ecumenical Liberation Theology Center is a Christian non-governmental organization based in Jerusalem; was founded in 1990 as an outgrowth of a conference regarding "Palestinian Liberation Theology." According to its web site, "Sabeel is an ecumenical grassroots liberation theology movement among Palestinian Christians. Inspired by the life and teaching of Jesus Christ, this liberation theology seeks to deepen the faith of Palestinian Christians, to promote unity among them toward social action. Sabeel strives to develop a spirituality based on love, justice, peace, nonviolence, liberation and reconciliation for the different national and faith communities. The word "Sabeel" is Arabic for 'the way' and also a 'channel' or 'spring' of life-giving water."

Sabeel has been criticized for its belief that "Israel is solely culpable for the origin and continuation of the Israeli–Palestinian conflict," and for using "anti-Semitic deicide imagery against Israel, and of disparaging Judaism as 'tribal,' 'primitive,' and 'exclusionary,' in contrast to Christianity’s 'universalism' and 'inclusiveness.'" In addition, Daniel Fink, writing on behalf of NGO Monitor, shows that Sabeel leader Naim Ateek has described Zionism as a "step backward in the development of Judaism", and Zionists as "oppressors and war makers".

=== "Kairos Palestine" document (2009) ===
In December 2009, a number of prominent Palestinian Christian activists, both clergy and lay people, released the Kairos Palestine document, "A moment of truth." Among the authors of the document are Michel Sabbah, former Latin Patriarch of Jerusalem, Archbishop Attalah Hanna, Father Jamal Khader, Rev. Mitri Raheb, Rev. Naim Ateek and Rifat Kassis who is the coordinator and chief spokesperson of the group.

The document declares the Israeli occupation of Palestine a "sin against God" and against humanity. It calls on churches and Christians all over the world to consider it and adopt it and to call for the boycott of Israel. Section 7 calls for "the beginning of a system of economic sanctions and boycott to be applied against Israel." It states that isolation of Israel will cause pressure on Israel to abolish all of what it labels as "apartheid laws" that discriminate against Palestinians and non-Jews.

=== Holy Land Christian Ecumenical Foundation ===
The Holy Land Christian Ecumenical Foundation (HCEF) was founded in 1999 by an ecumenical group of American Christians, including Rateb Y. Rabie, to preserve the Christian presence in the Holy Land. HCEF stated goal is to attempt to continue the presence and well-being of Arab Christians in the Holy Land and to develop the bonds of solidarity between them and Christians elsewhere. HCEF offers material assistance to Palestinian Christians and to churches in the area. HCEF advocates for solidarity on the part of Western Christians with Christians in the Holy Land.

=== Christians of Gaza ===
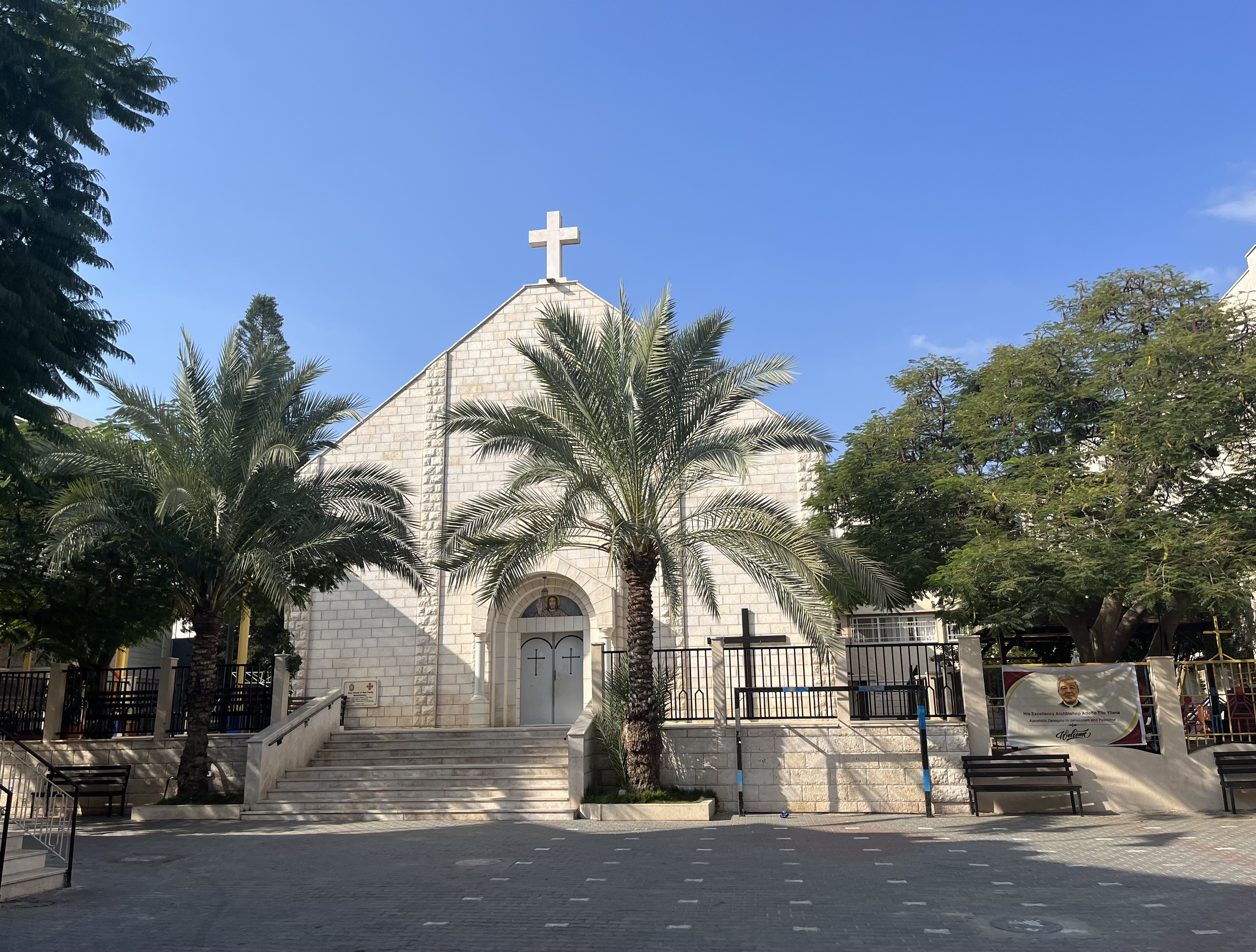
Holy Family Church in Gaza, November 2022

In 2022, there were approximately 1,100 Christians in the Gaza Strip, down from 1,300 in 2013, and from 5,000 in the mid-1990s. Gaza's Christian community mostly lives within the city, especially in areas neighbouring the three main churches: Church of Saint Porphyrius, The Holy Family Catholic Parish in Zeitoun Street, and the Gaza Baptist Church, in addition to an Anglican chapel in the Al-Ahli Al-Arabi Arab Evangelical Hospital. Saint Porphyrius is an Orthodox Church that dates back to the 12th century. Gaza Baptist Church is the city's only Evangelical Church; it lies close to the Legislative Council (parliamentary building). While some reports claim that Christians in Gaza freely practice their religion and may observe all the religious holidays in accordance with the Christian calendars followed by their churches, other reports claim forceful conversion to Islam, public insults, kidnapping, fear of radical Islamist groups, and vandalism.

Those among them working as civil servants in the government and in the private sector are given an official holiday during the week, which some devote to communal prayer in churches. Christians are permitted to obtain any job, in addition to having their full rights and duties as their Muslim counterparts in accordance with the Palestinian Declaration of Independence, the regime, and all the systems prevailing over the territories. Moreover, seats have been allocated to Christian citizens in the Palestinian Legislative Council (PLC) in accordance with a quota system that allocates based on a significant Christian presence.

A census revealed that 40 percent of the Christian community worked in the medical, educational, engineering and law sectors. Additionally, the churches in Gaza are renowned for the relief and educational services that they offer, and Muslim citizens participate in these services. Palestinian citizens as a whole benefit from these services. The Latin Patriarchate School, for example, offers relief in the form of medication and social and educational services. The school has been offering services for nearly 150 years.

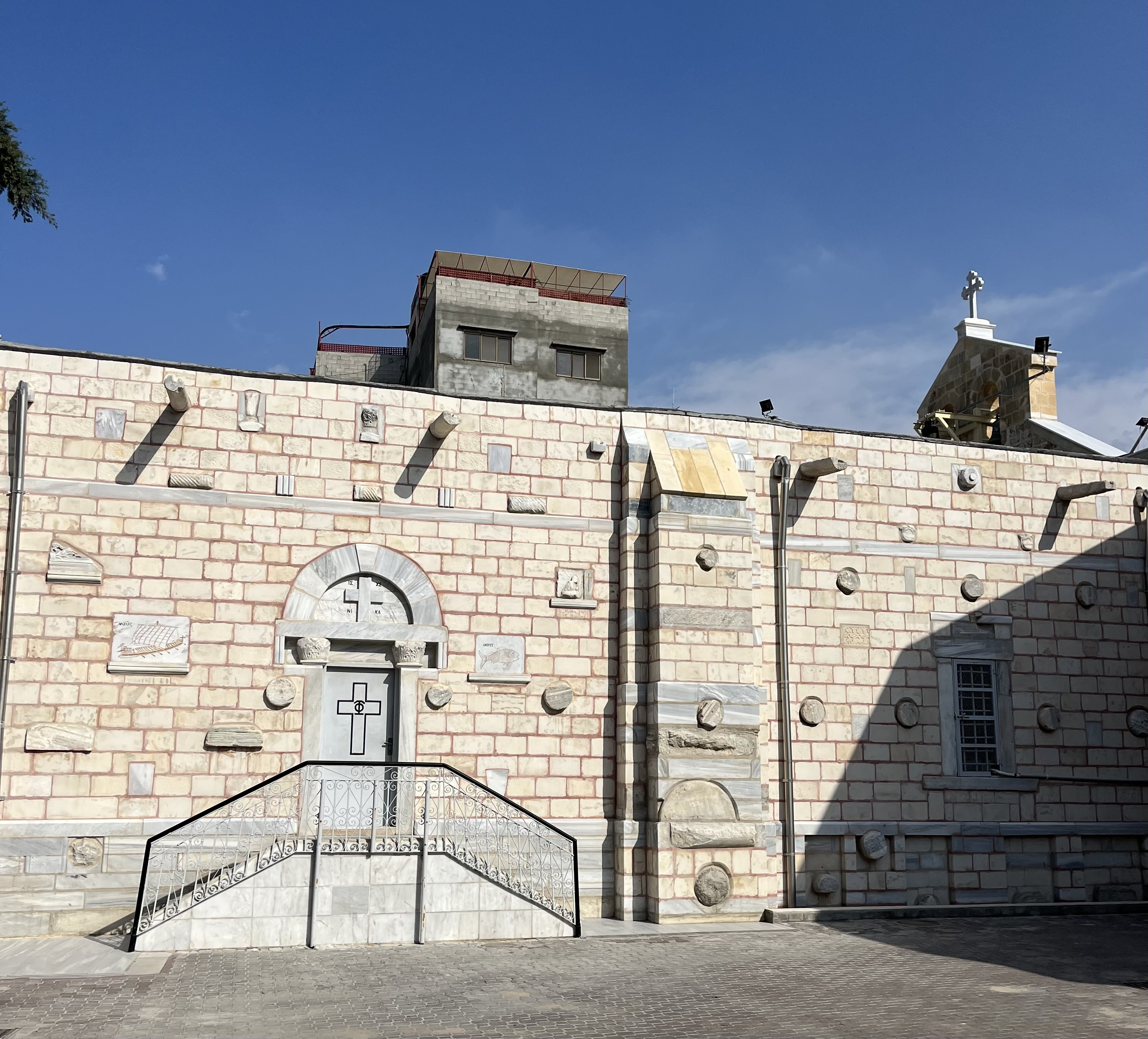
Church of Saint Porphyrius in 2022, before the Israeli airstrike

In 1974, the idea of establishing a new school was proposed by Father Jalil Awad, a former parish priest in Gaza who recognized the need to expand the Latin Patriarchate School and build a new complex. In 2011, the Holy family school had 1,250 students and the Roman Catholic primary school, which is an extension of the Latin Patriarchate School, continues to enroll a rising number of young students. The primary school was established approximately 20 years ago. Aside from education, other services are offered to Muslims and Christians alike with no discrimination. Services include women's groups, students' groups and youth groups, such as those offered at the Baptist Church on weekdays. As of 2013, only 113 out of 968 of these Christian schools’ students were in fact Christians.

In October 2007, Rami Ayyad, the Baptist manager of The Teacher's Bookshop, the only Christian bookstore in the Gaza Strip, was murdered, following the firebombing of his bookstore and the receipt of death threats from Muslim extremists.

In 2008, the gate of the Rosary Sisters School was blown up, and the library of a Christian organization for youth was blown up with the guard being kidnapped.

From the 3,000 Christians in 2007 when Israel intensified its siege and drove them out of the poor area, estimates indicate that the number of Christians in Gaza has decreased since. With a history stretching back to the first century, the 800–1,000 Christians who are thought to still be in Gaza represent the oldest Christian community in the world. At least eighteen people were killed when Israel bombed the Church of Saint Porphyrius, which is the oldest in Gaza, on 19 October 2023.

=== Christian emigration ===
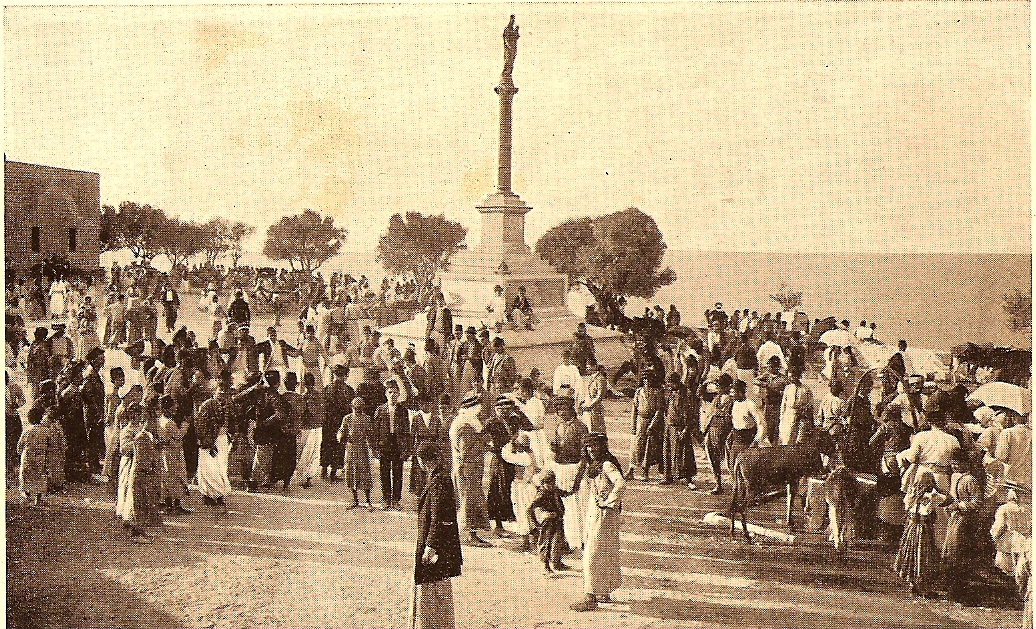
A pre-1948 celebration of the Feast of St. Elias at Stella Maris Monastery on Mount Carmel, on 20 July

In addition to neighboring countries, such as Lebanon and Jordan, many Palestinian Christians emigrated to countries in Latin America (notably Argentina and Chile), as well as to Australia, the United States and Canada. The Palestinian Authority is unable to keep exact tallies. The share of Christians in the population has also decreased due to the fact that Muslim Palestinians generally have much higher birth rates than the Christians.

The causes of this Christian exodus are hotly debated, with various possibilities put forth. Many of the Palestinian Christians in the diaspora are those who fled or were expelled during the 1948 war and their descendants. After discussion between Yosef Weitz and Moshe Sharett, Ben-Gurion authorized a project for the transference of the Christian communities of the Galilee to Argentina, but the proposal failed in the face of Christian opposition. Reuters has reported that the emigrants since then have left in pursuit of better living standards.

The BBC has also blamed the economic decline in the Palestinian Authority as well as pressure from the Israeli-Palestinian conflict for the exodus. A report on Bethlehem residents stated both Christians and Muslims wished to leave but the Christians possessed better contacts with people abroad and higher levels of education. The Vatican and the Catholic Church blamed the Israeli occupation and the conflict in the Holy Land for the Christian exodus from the Holy Land and the Middle East in general.

The Jerusalem Post (an Israeli newspaper) has stated that the "shrinking of the Palestinian Christian community in the Holy Land came as a direct result of its middle-class standards" and that Muslim pressure has not played a major role according to Christian residents themselves. It reported that the Christians have a public image of elitism and of class privilege as well as of non-violence and of open personalities, which leaves them more vulnerable to criminals than Muslims. Hanna Siniora, a prominent Christian Palestinian human rights activist, has attributed harassment against Christians to "little groups" of "hoodlums" rather than to the Hamas and Fatah governments. In his last novel, the Palestinian Christian writer Emile Habibi has a character affirm that: "There is no difference between Christian and Muslim: we are all Palestinian in our predicament."

According to a report in The Independent, thousands of Christian Palestinians "emigrated to Latin America in the 1920s, when Mandatory Palestine was hit by drought and a severe economic depression."

Today, Chile houses the largest Palestinian Christian community in the world outside of the Levant. As many as 350,000 Palestinian Christians reside in Chile, most of whom came from Beit Jala, Bethlehem, and Beit Sahur. Also, El Salvador, Honduras, Brazil, Colombia, Argentina, Venezuela, and other Latin American countries have significant Palestinian Christian communities, some of whom immigrated almost a century ago during the time of Ottoman Palestine.

In a 2006 poll of Christians in Bethlehem by the Palestinian Centre for Research and Cultural Dialogue, 90% reported having Muslim friends, 73% agreed that the Palestinian Authority treats Christian heritage in the city with respect, and 78% attributed the ongoing exodus of Christians from Bethlehem to the Israeli occupation and travel restrictions on the area. Daniel Rossing, the Israeli Ministry of Religious Affairs' chief liaison to Christians in the 1970s and 1980s, has stated that the situations for them in Gaza became much worse after the election of Hamas. He also stated that the Palestinian Authority, which counts on Christian westerners for financial support, treats the minority fairly. He blamed the Israeli West Bank barrier as the primary problem for the Christians.

The United States State Department's 2006 report on religious freedom criticized both Israel for its restrictions on travel to Christian holy sites and the Palestinian Authority for its failure to stamp out anti-Christian crime. It also reported that the former gives preferential treatment in basic civic services to Jews and the latter does so to Muslims. The report stated that, generally, ordinary Muslim and Christian citizens enjoy good relations in contrast to the "strained" Jewish and Arab relations. A 2005 BBC report also described Muslim and Christian relations as "peaceful".

The Arab Human Rights Association, an Arab NGO in Israel, has stated that Israeli authorities have denied Palestinian Christians in Israel access to holy places, prevented repairs needed to preserve historic holy sites, and carried out physical attacks on religious leaders.

Multiple factors, the internal dislocation of Palestinians in wars; the creation of three contiguous refugee camps for those displaced; emigration of Muslims from Hebron; hindrances to development under Israeli military occupation with its land confiscations, and a lax and corrupt judicial system under the PNA that is often incapable of enforcing laws, have all contributed to Christian emigration, which has been a tradition since the British Mandate period. This has been contested, as the main cause of Christian emigration from Bethlehem, Kairos Palestine—an independent coalition Christian organisation, set up to help communicate to the Christian world what is happening in Palestine—sent a letter to The Wall Street Journal to explain that "In the case of Bethlehem, for instance, it is in fact the rampant construction of Israeli settlements, the chokehold imposed by the separation wall and the Israeli government's confiscation of Palestinian land that has driven many Christians to leave," the unprinted letter, quoted in Haaretz, states. "At present, a mere 13 percent of Bethlehem-area land is left to its Palestinian inhabitants".

Most of the Gaza Strip's Christian population lived in Gaza City, in the north. In 2023 the Israeli militarily attempted to force them out by the Israeli invasion of the Gaza Strip. As of October 2024, most of Gaza's Christians had refused to leave, our not felt safe to traverse the war zone. In November 2024, Israel announced that no Palestinians would be allowed to "return" to North Gaza.

=== Persecutions ===
Majority of Palestinian Christians are leaving the territories due to the Arab-Israeli conflict. There have been reports of attacks on Palestinian Christians in Gaza from Muslim extremist groups. Gaza Pastor Manuel Musallam has voiced doubts that those attacks were religiously motivated.

Fr Pierbattista Pizzaballa, the Custodian of the Holy Land, a senior Catholic spokesman, has stated that police inaction and an educational culture that encourages Jewish children to treat Christians with "contempt" has made life increasingly "intolerable" for many Christians. Fr Pizzaballa's statement came after pro-settler extremists attacked a Trappist monastery in the town of Latroun, setting fire to its door, and covering walls with anti-Christian graffiti. The incident followed a series of acts of arson and vandalism, in 2012, targeting places of Christian worship, including Jerusalem's 11th century Monastery of the Cross, where slogans such as "Death to Christians" and other offensive graffiti were daubed on its walls. According to an article in the Telegraph, Christian leaders feel that the most important issue that Israel has failed to address is the practice of some ultra-Orthodox Jewish schools to teach children that it is a religious obligation to abuse anyone in Holy Orders they encounter in public, such that Ultra-Orthodox Jews, including children as young as eight, spit at members of the clergy on a daily basis.

After Pope Benedict XVI's comments on Islam in September 2006, five churches of various denominations were firebombed and shot at in the West Bank and Gaza. A Muslim extremist group called "Lions of Monotheism" claimed responsibility. Former Palestinian Prime Minister and Hamas leader Ismail Haniyeh condemned the attacks, and police presence was elevated in Bethlehem, which has a sizable Christian community.

Armenians in Jerusalem, identified as Palestinian Christians or Israeli-Armenians, have also been attacked and received threats from Jewish extremists; Christians and clergy have been spat at, and one Armenian Archbishop was beaten and his centuries-old cross broken. In September 2009, two Armenian Christian clergy were expelled after a brawl erupted with a Jewish extremist for spitting on holy Christian objects.

In February 2009, a group of Christian activists within the West Bank wrote an open letter asking Pope Benedict XVI to postpone his scheduled trip to Israel unless the government changed its treatment. They highlighted improved access to places of worship and ending the taxation of church properties as key concerns. The Pope began his five-day visit to Israel and the Palestinian Authority on Sunday, 10 May, planning to express support for the region's Christians. In response to Palestinian public statements, Israeli Foreign Ministry spokesman Yigal Palmor criticized the political polarization of the papal visit, remarking that "[i]t will serve the cause of peace much better if this visit is taken for what it is, a pilgrimage, a visit for the cause of peace and unity".

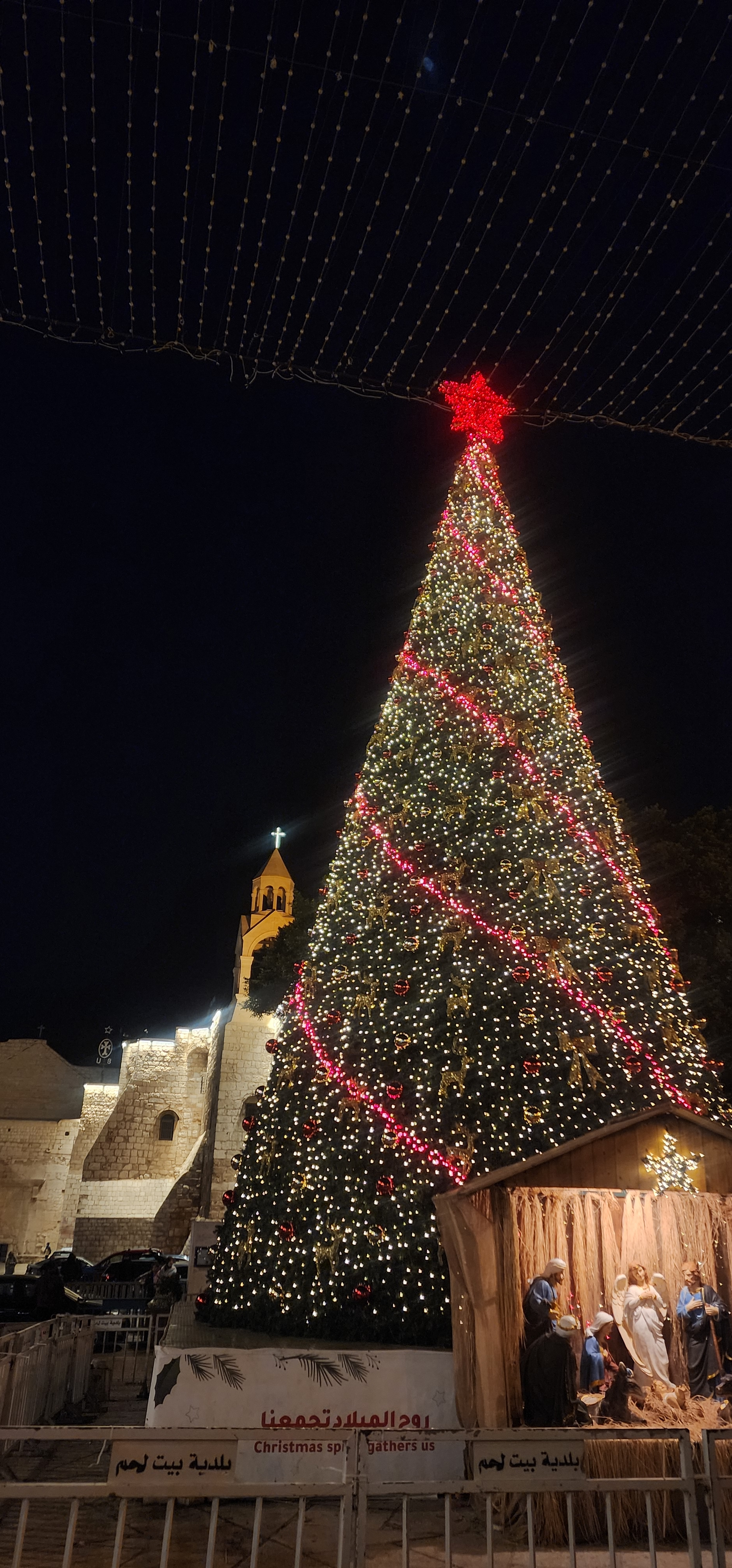
A Christmas tree in Bethlehem

Bethlehem

Christian families are the largest landowners in Bethlehem and have often been subject to theft of property. Bethlehem's core of traditional Christian and Muslim families speak of the rise of a 'foreign', more conservative, Islamic Hebronite class as changing the traditional regional identity of the town, as are the villages dominated by the Ta'amre Bedouin clans close to Bethlehem. Rising Muslim land purchase, said at times to be Saudi-financed, and incidents of land theft with forged documents, except in Beit Sahour where Christian and Muslims share a strong sense of local identity, are seen by Christians as making their demographic presence vulnerable. Christians are often described as of Yamani descent (as are some Muslim clans), vs the al-Qaysi Muslim clans, respectively from southern and northern Arabia. Christians are wary of the international media and of discussing these issues publicly, which involve criticism of fellow Palestinians, since there is a risk that their remarks may be manipulated by outsiders to undermine Palestinian claims to nationhood, distract attention from the crippling impact of Israel's occupation, and conjure up an image of a Muslim drive to oust Christians from Bethlehem.

The Christian Broadcasting Network (an American Protestant organization) claimed that Palestinian Christians suffer systematic discrimination and persecution at the hands of the predominantly Muslim population and Palestinian government aimed at driving their population out of their homeland. However, Palestinian Christians in Bethlehem and Beit Jala have claimed otherwise that it is the loss of agricultural land and expropriation from the Israeli military, the persecution of 1948 and violence from the military occupation that has led to a flight and major exodus of Christians.

On 26 September 2015, the Mar Charbel monastery in Bethlehem was set on fire, resulting in the burning of many rooms and damaging various parts of the building.

In September 2016, the Jerusalem-based Center for Jewish–Christian Understanding and Cooperation (CJCUC) established Blessing Bethlehem, a charity fundraising initiative with the purpose of helping the persecuted Christians living in the city of Bethlehem and its surrounding areas.

In October 2026, the Serbian Orthodox Church voiced concern regarding the situation of Christians in Palestine, cautioning against attempts to diminish their long-standing historical presence. In a letter addressed to Palestinian official Ramzi Khouri, Serbian Patriarch Porfirije characterized the community's circumstances as involving "suffering, persecution and discrimination," while underscoring that Christians have sustained a continuous presence in the region for over two millennia. The church appealed for the safeguarding of Christian communities and for adherence to international law and religious rights. The Palestinian committee has repeatedly raised alarms over attacks on Christian institutions in the occupied West Bank and East Jerusalem, and restrictions on worship, education and access to religious sites.

== See also ==
- List of Palestinian Christians
- Arab Christians
- Arab Orthodox Movement
- Demographic history of Palestine (region)
- Arab Christian citizens of Israel
- Christianity in Israel
