= Christian political theology in the Middle East =

Christian political theology in the Middle East is a religious response by Christian leaders and scholars to political problems. Political theologians try to balance the demands of a tumultuous region with the delicate but long history of Christianity in the Middle East. This has yielded a diversity of political theology disproportionate to the small size of Middle Eastern Christian minorities. The region's importance to Christians worldwide – both for history and doctrinal authority for many denominations – also shapes the political theologies of the Middle East.

== Background ==
For many Christian leaders, the dominant approach to political theology is one of survival. Many Arab Christians see themselves as the heirs of a rich Christian heritage whose existence is threatened by regional unrest and religious persecution. Their chief political goal is survival, which sets their political theology apart.

At times, Arab Christian leaders have appealed to Christians outside the region through both denominational challenges and broader calls to Christian unity for humanitarian or political aid. In other cases, Christian politicians downplay their faith in the public sphere to avoid conflict with their Muslim neighbours.

In the mid-20th century, many Christians in the Middle East saw secular politics as a way out of their traditional status as a minority community in the Islamic world. Christians played prominent roles throughout the pan-Arab nationalist movement in the mid-20th century, where their experience with Western politics and generally high educational attainments made their contributions valuable to nationalist governments around the region. One prominent example was Michel Aflaq, an Eastern Orthodox Christian, who formed the first Ba'ath group from students in Damascus in the 1940s. His belief was that Christians should embrace Islam as part of their cultural identity because nationalism was the best way for Christians to be successful in the Middle East.

== Approaches to political theology ==
With the shift from pan-Arab nationalist movements into Islam-oriented politics, Christians have changed their approach. They have also lost influence because their numbers have declined due to birthrate, emigration, and sometimes overt persecution. Some Christians seek to emphasize the historic Christian presence as a sign of their commitment to the homeland. This ties the Christian minority to the national identity. These Christians often point to the presence of shrines and holy sites nearby to justify the importance of remaining in the Middle East. They emphasize their homeland as the birthplace of Christianity, even at the sacrifice of some religious duties such as evangelical work, as conversion from Islam is illegal in most Middle Eastern countries.

Other Christians who live in nations with governments less friendly to them emphasize their ties as Christians with political power in Europe and the United States. They sometimes call on these ties through the corresponding religious leaders in Western nations in the hope that foreign governments will aid their causes from the outside.

=== Israel/Palestine ===
Palestinian Christians make up two per cent of the population in Israel and the West Bank / Gaza, and Christians generally emphasize their Palestinian identity over their religious identity in political affairs. Their generally high educational attainments made them key leaders causes for Palestinian nationalism, where they emphasized their historic ties to the Holy Land and religious bonds with Muslims and Jews, but the rise of Islamist groups, and their own declining numbers, has changed the Christian approach to one of influence rather than direct wielding of power.

==== Palestinian liberation theology ====
Palestinian liberation theology first emerged during the 1948 Palestine war, and was developed during the first Palestinian Intifada in the 1980s. It was an effort to reconcile the Christian duties of love and forgiveness, as well as the role of the Bible in Christian and Jewish Zionism, with the struggles of the Israeli–Palestinian conflict. Like Latin American liberation theology, it emphasizes justice for Palestinians while insisting on the need for Christian love.

==== Key figures ====
- Naim Ateek, an Anglican priest whose family settled in Jerusalem after expulsion from the Galilee, founded Palestinian Liberation Theology and published a book in 1989 called Justice and Only Justice: A Palestinian Theology of Liberation.
- Elias Chacour, a former archbishop in the Melkite Greek Catholic Church, has worked to create a liberation theology that emphasizes love and support for both Jews and Palestinians. He has used educational activism and non-violent political protest to call for Palestinian equality in Israel.
- Mitri Raheb, an Evangelical Lutheran priest in Bethlehem, writes that the people of the Holy Land have lived under an occupying power since the time of Jesus. His writings use the Bible to establish a place for Palestinians in the Christian narrative.
- Munther Isaac, a Palestinian Christian pastor, author, and theologian based in the West Bank. Raised in Beit Sahour, he completed a PhD at the Oxford Centre for Mission Studies, later becoming the director of the Christ at the Checkpoint conference and the academic dean of Bethlehem Bible College. Ordained to the Evangelical Lutheran Church in Jordan and the Holy Land in 2016, he currently pastors two churches, including the Christmas Lutheran Church in Bethlehem.
- Salim Munayer, a Palestinian theologian who was the Academic Dean of the Bethlehem Bible College and founder of Musalaha (vision of reconciliation). He comes from the city of Lydda and lives in Jerusalem. Salim wrote on many subjects such as justice, identity and reconciliation.

=== Jordan ===
Christians in Jordan are either descendants of the native Bedouin tribes or of Palestinian refugees, and they point to their historic presence in the area, which predates Islam, as a way of proving their loyalty to Jordan's sympathetic monarchy. Christian politicians formed a surprising political alliance with the Muslim Brotherhood during the 2016 campaign season. Christians justify this by pointing to the need to maintain their historic presence for family and religious reasons, given their proximity to many holy sites.

== Documents ==
Christian leaders in the Middle East garner support from fellow Christians in other nations, sometimes by issuing direct calls to act on the demands made by their political theology.

=== Kairos Palestine document ===
The Kairos document is a call from Palestinian Christian leaders for peaceful co-existence in the Holy Land, beginning with a re-negotiation of rights in Jerusalem for "two peoples" and "three religions". The document's theology begins with an insistence on God's love for all people and for Christian love for others, which sometimes requires strong action. The Kairos document argues against theologians who use the Bible to justify a religious state in the Holy Land, where Palestinian Christians and Muslims have a "natural right" to live. The authors place their hope for peace in God rather than political action, saying "resistance with love" is "a right and a duty for the Christian". The document references the Apostle Paul's statement to not resist evil with evil, but it stops short of condemning terrorism, calling instead for a removal of the "roots of 'terrorism'".

=== From the Nile to the Euphrates ===
The Christian Academic Forum for Citizenship in the Arab World released the region's first "public theology" in 2014, titled From the Nile to the Euphrates: The Call of Faith and Citizenship. The document's authors are scholars from Egypt, Syria, Lebanon, Jordan, Palestine, and Iraq, and it critically analyzes the role of religion in helping with the region's educational, social, and structurally political problems. The document stresses religion's potential for harm in political life multiple times and repeatedly emphasizes the need for Christians and Muslims to work together using principles of equality and freedom.
