= Archbishop Hanna =

Archbishop Hanna may refer to the following people.

- Edward Joseph Hanna, Roman Catholic Archbishop of San Francisco
- Archbishop Theodosios (Hanna) of Sebastia, Eastern Orthodox Archbishop of Sebastia
