= Mark Braverman =

American psychologist

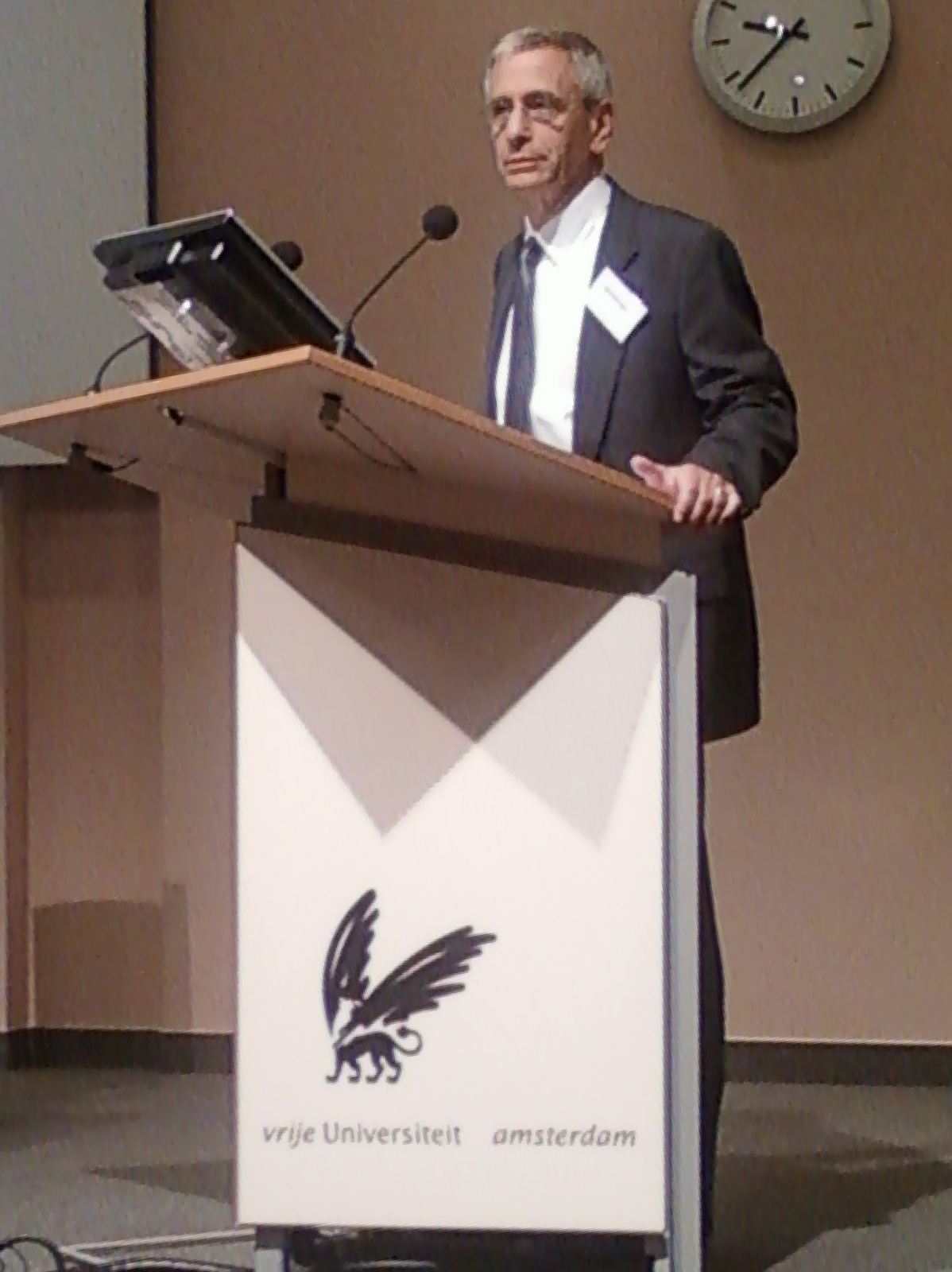
Braverman in 2011

Mark Braverman (born 1948) is an American psychologist and activist for Palestinian rights. He is the executive director of Kairos USA, a pro-Palestinian group for American Christians.

== Early life and education ==
Braverman was born in 1948 to a Conservative Jewish family in Philadelphia, United States.

He has written that his grandfather was "a fifth-generation Palestinian Jew" who "was born in the Old City of Jerusalem" and was "a direct descendant of the Lubavicher Rebbe." The grandfather emigrated to the U.S. early in the 20th century.

He has said that he was brought up a Zionist. “Zionism was mother's milk,” he has written, “together with love for and connection with my family, almost all of whom live in Israel. I was raised as a Conservative Jew – I was a product of Solomon Schechter Day School, President of Philadelphia Region USY and National Vice President, and a camper and then counselor at Camp Ramah.”

He has described his grandmother as “a sweet woman with a big heart” who got her family through the Great Depression and struggled with “a tyrannical father and an equally tyrannical husband.” She was a member of Hadassah, the women's Zionist organization. For her, he has maintained, “there were no Palestinians and there was no Nakba. There was only this precious reality of Israel, this wondrous repository of Jewish culture, this bulwark against the Nations Who Seek to Destroy Us.” He has said that this grandmother was “a product of her upbringing and of her times,” which “for the Jews of America...were simpler times.”

== Evolving views of Israel ==
Braverman has written that he first traveled to Israel in the early 1960s with other people from Camp Ramah. Elsewhere, he has written that he “fell in love” with Israel when he first visited Israeli relatives at age 17. But though those relatives “warmly embraced me,” he has said, he “noticed the fear and sense of superiority in the way they talked about 'the Arabs.'” It reminded him, he has maintained, of white racists in the U.S. talking about people of color in the years before the Civil Rights era, and it was then that he saw “that there was a fundamental flaw in the Zionist project.”

Still, his “love for Israel stayed strong,” and after college he lived on Kibbutz Sasa, “ignoring the implications of the pre-1948 Palestinian homes turned into Jewish housing and the abandoned olive groves on the edges of the newly-planted apple orchards.” Over the years, he has written, his “concerns about Israel increased in direct proportion to the pace of illegal settlement-building;” the “pictures of Israeli bulldozers uprooting three hundred year-old olive trees and Jewish soldiers restraining Arab villagers crying hysterically over the destruction of their groves” changed his view of the Israeli tree-planting of his youth. Yet, he has said, he continued to cling to “the Zionist narrative: the Occupation, although lamentably abusive of human rights, was the price of security.”

But when he went to the West Bank in 2006, his view of Israel changed entirely. He “saw the hillsides denuded of trees to build concrete Jewish settlement cities” and “saw Arab houses leveled and gardens taken to make way for a 30 foot-high concrete wall cutting through Palestinian cities and village fields.” He decided that the argument that the wall's purpose was to defend Israel was “a lie.” And he “realized that, no matter what rationales were advanced in justification of Israel’s current policies, these actions would never lead to peace and security for Israel. I saw that the role of occupier was leading Israel down a road of political disaster, and the Jewish people down a road of spiritual peril.”

These observations, plus his personal encounters with Palestinians during the same 2006 trip, “fundamentally changed” his views of Israel, Braverman has maintained. A profile of him recounted his daily walks, during that visit, “from Israeli West Jerusalem to Arab East Jerusalem,” where the director of Sabeel, a Palestinian aid organization, called herself a follower of Jesus, whom she described as “a Palestinian Jew who said, ‘Love your enemies.’” “This,” according to the profile, “all made sense to him.”

Braverman has since “devoted himself full-time to the Israel-Palestine conflict,” which he has called “the greatest crisis in Jewish history since the Babylonian exile.”

== Current views ==
Braverman has written that while he “grew up believing that Israel was the key to Jewish survival,” he now feels that “our task is to rescue Judaism from an ideology that has hijacked the faith, continues to fuel global conflict, and has produced one of the most systematic and longstanding violations of human rights in the world today.” He rejects the idea that Zionism has liberated Jews “from the powerlessness and humiliation of the ghetto,” arguing that “in reality Zionism has served to keep Jews trapped in an isolationist, exclusivist past” and “yoked...to a theology of territoriality and tribal privilege.”

Braverman has asserted that “Palestine is being destroyed. Israel has all the power. The Palestinian people — a good, patient people — are being ground into the dirt, their leaders killed, imprisoned or exiled, their young people impoverished and robbed of a future. Any possibility for nonviolent protest is made all but impossible by a brutal military occupation.” Jews, he has said, have “blood on our hands.” As for Palestinian terror, “we must look to the cause.”

Braverman has called on Christians not to “give the Jewish people a free pass,” as he puts it, “out of a sense of guilt for anti-Semitism.”

Braverman has said that “by and large the Palestinians are a peaceful, patient people – and at this pass an angry, humiliated and pained people.” He attributes their plight largely to a “relative lack of organization...in the face of the highly organized and effective Zionist colonial project.”

In a letter to an American rabbi who disagreed with his views, Braverman insisted: “We are doing wrong. We have blood on our hands.” He said that “for most of my adult life” he had chosen “to ignore this truth. Then I saw it with my eyes. Rabbi, you must go and see.” Describing the “Separation Wall” as consisting of a “sanitized Israeli section” and a “real” section which “snak[es] through the West Bank on stolen land, separating Palestinians from Palestinians,” he denied that its real purpose is security, and argued that the checkpoints perpetrate “baseless humiliation and oppression...in our name.”

While acknowledging to the rabbi that the Hamas Charter is “an ugly thing,” he insisted that it “has to be seen in the context of the idiom it uses, and in the political context of a response to the secular PLO regime which was not working.” He further denied that Hamas, since its 2006 electoral victory, had vowed to destroy Israel, and he rejected the claim that there is widespread anti-Semitism in Gaza.

The only way for Israel to be compelled to obey international law and “behave...decently toward the people of Palestine,” Braverman told the rabbi, is for the U.S. “to change its policy of an unconditional green light.” He dismissed concerns about what would happen if Israel became a non-Jewish state: “What if Israel no longer had a Jewish majority...? So what?” He also waved away concerns that “Israel, with the best Army in the world and the full backing of the US, is on the verge of destruction by a ragtag popular movement with basement bombs,” saying that such concerns are “our victim complex talking...the legacy of the trauma of the Holocaust.”

He has written: “I am a proud Jew. I love Israel. And I am heartsick about her.”

== Career ==
=== Psychologist and consultant ===
Braverman has extensive experience as a clinical psychologist with an expertise in “traumatic stress and its effect on individuals in disasters, mass violence, organizational change, conflict, and critical incidents.” He describes himself as an “organizational consultant” with a specialty in “corporate crisis management and employment issues related to mental health, work-related stress, organizational change, and conflict and violence in the workplace.”

He has “worked with private corporations, government agencies and public entities across the globe in the prevention, response, mitigation and recovery from disasters, violence and potentially business-ending crises -- providing training, policy development, and acute crisis intervention services.” He has also worked as a consultant and trainer for various federal agencies in connection with “workplace violence policy, workplace traumatic stress, and occupational health issues,” and testified in 1992 before a joint U.S. Congressional Subcommittee on “the causes of violence in the U.S. Postal Service.”

=== CMG Associates / Braverman Group ===
Braverman and his wife, Susan, founded the founded Crisis Management Group (CMG Associates) in 1988. Seeking “to respond to the needs of companies, communities and public entities that had experienced a traumatic event,” the Bravermans “developed the industry’s first Workplace Psychological Trauma Intervention Program for Digital Equipment Corporation – a program that has served as a model for the subsequent development of employee-focused critical incident intervention in the workplace.” CMG, later the Braverman Group, gradually expanded its scope, offering “a range of innovative Employee Assistance Programs, providing plans to meet the needs of each client organization.”

=== Kairos USA ===
Braverman is currently the executive director of Kairos USA, an American Christian movement that was inspired by Kairos Palestine and that has issued its own statement, entitled “Call to Action: a U.S. Christian response to the Palestine Kairos document.”

Founded in June 2011 by American Christian clerics, theologians, and laypersons, Kairos USA describes itself as having been founded in response to “the 2009 call of our Palestinian sisters and brothers in Christ to stand with them in their struggle for their fundamental human rights.” Kairos USA describes itself as “taking a bold, prophetic stand for justice in the Holy Land” and as “expressing our love for our sisters and brothers in Israel who for their entire history as a state have been suffering from the social, psychological and spiritual costs of militarization and war itself.”

=== Friends of Tent of Nations North America ===
Braverman co-founded Friends of Tent of Nations North America (FOTONNA), a 501(c)3 corporation that is partly dedicated to helping the family of Palestinian Christian Daoud Nassar to safeguard its land on the West Bank, which Israeli sought to acquire. Braverman was involved in Nassar's 2007 U.S. speaking tour.

=== Other groups ===
Braverman serves on the advisory board of Friends of Sabeel North America, as well as of the Israeli Committee Against House Demolitions, USA (ICAHD USA). He is a consultant to the Israel Palestine Mission Network of the Presbyterian Church USA and to Evangelicals for Middle East Understanding. He is also a charter member of American Jews for a Just Peace and has also been involved with Jewish Voice for Peace.

=== PCUSA-related activities ===
In mid-2008, a year and a half before the publication of the Kairos Palestine document, Braverman publicly supported the Presbyterian Church USA in its deliberations regarding the possibility of divesting from Israel. Addressing the people of the Presbyterian Church, he wrote: “I honor your struggle. You may not have found the answer yet, but you are grappling with the issue. And the issue is justice.”

In a 2010 article, Braverman recounted his experience at the 219th General Assembly of the Presbyterian Church USA in Minneapolis, to which he had been invited by the PCUSA's Israel Palestine Mission Network. He described a report, “Break Down the Walls,” which was produced by the Church's Middle East Study Committee, and which examined “the Israeli occupation’s impact on Palestinian society” and urged the U.S. government to make military aid to Israel contingent on ending the occupation,” as “a precious and faithful document.” Noting that the Simon Wiesenthal Center had called the report “poisonous,” “a declaration of war on Israel,” and an assault on the very “foundations of interfaith relations,” Braverman dismissed these charges as representative of “the tack that has been taken for years by the mainstream Jewish community” toward “questions about Israel’s policies or the Zionist project itself.”

“Sixty five years ago,” wrote Braverman in connection with the PCUSA report, “the Christian world stood before the ovens of Auschwitz-Birkenau and said, “What have we done?” Since then, Christian-Jewish relations have been driven by the Jewish desire for safety and protection on the one hand and the powerful Christian drive for penitence for millennia of anti-Jewish doctrine and behavior on the other.”

Braverman wrote a letter to the Christian Century protesting an article by Ted Smith and Amy-Jill Levine of Vanderbilt Seminary that had appeared in that magazine. Smith and Levine had argued that the PCUSA report “evokes old echoes of theological supersessionism and transposes them into a political key.” Referring to the supersessionism that is the basis of the report's argument and that had, in their view, long characterized Christian dialogue with Jews, Smith and Levine had written that “Old habits die hard”; in response, Braverman protested that “it is the habit of crying anti-Semitism whenever Jewish sensibilities are disturbed or the actions of the State of Israel are questioned that we must urgently confront.”

Noting the “sharp disagreement” over the report within the PCUSA, Braverman said that he “despaired that anyone who...had not seen the occupation with his or her own eyes would understand that the report was not biased” against Jews or Israel, and would not recognize “that it was simply telling the truth and recommending that the church respond accordingly.” While some PCUSA members were concerned that “Breaking Down the Walls” was anti-Semitic, Braverman insisted that it was, much to the contrary, an expression of Christians' love for Jews, “love in the deepest, truest sense – love as Jesus and Paul teach us to love – love the way Amos and Hosea, Isaiah and Jeremiah taught us when they spoke truth to power.”

While Braverman and several other Jews attended the PCUSA meeting to advocate for the passage of “Breaking Down the Walls,” another group of Jews, including members of the Simon Wiesenthal Center, the Jewish Council on Public Affairs, and the Institute for Christian and Jewish Studies, were there to oppose passage of the report. Braverman celebrated the failure of the latter coalition, writing that “I believe that they were surprised at this outcome – Jewish advocacy groups having the final say on Christian words and actions with respect to Israel and Zionism is a time-honored pursuit. It has been rewarded with success for generations.”

== Other events ==
Braverman has delivered a number of sermons in Christian churches. In 2006, for example, speaking at the First Congregational Church of Old Lyme, CT, he said that when he met the Palestinian Christian Daoud Nassar, founder of Tent of Nations, “my relationship to Israel changed forever. My witness began. I met the Living Stones of the Land.” He described Nassar's farm, which “stands, alone, ringed by Jewish settlements and the encroaching Separation Wall, the last holdout in a region earmarked for taking by the Jewish State. The government has offered millions for the land and safe passage out of Palestine, but the family remains steadfast. Daoud told us: 'We are not allowed to give up. This land is my mother. My mother is not for sale.'...'Peace is like a tree,' Daoud says, 'first you have to nurture it, give it lots of water until the roots are established, and then it can grow on its own.'”

In 2011, Braverman was the U.S. delegate to the Southern Africa-Palestine Encounter in Johannesburg, where he presented a lecture on “Kairos theology, interfaith politics, and the role of the church in bringing a just peace to Israel and Palestine.” In September 2011 he lectured and led workshops at the “Moment of Truth” conference of Kairos Netherlands at the Free University of Amsterdam. In May 2012, he delivered lectures on Kairos theology at the Iona Community in Argyle, Scotland.

A 2012 article in a University of Illinois student newspaper reported on a speech Braverman had given under the auspices of the university's Center for South Asian and Middle Eastern Studies. Although Braverman had been invited “to speak about peace in the Middle East,” the article maintained that the invitation had instead “opened a forum for anti-Semitic and anti-Israel hostilities.” Braverman, according to this account, had first described Zionism as “an integral part of Judaism,” and then called it racism. Thus, in his view, “Judaism is inherently racist.” The author of the article accused Braverman of using “his own Jewish faith” to legitimize anti-Israeli views and “hide...anti-Semitic feelings.” Braverman has responded to such charges over the years, saying that he has never equated Zionism with Judaism, or the Jewish people with the State of Israel. "Judaism is committed to human equality and to the principles of compassion and fairness that form the bedrock of Christianity and the best of Western civilization" Braverman has said. "Modern political Zionism was founded on similar principles, but in reality and in practice has effectively become something very different, and represents a dire threat to the character and soul of the Jewish religion and the Jewish people. When words such as racism and genocide are used in connection with Zionism, we must look at this squarely and not hold back from acknowledging when and where it fits. To not see where Zionism, as an ethnic nationalist ideology, has taken us, is foolish, risky, and suicidal."

== Writings ==
Braverman is the author of Fatal Embrace: Christians, Jews and the Search for Peace in the Holy Land. Braverman's website describes the book as showing “how the Jewish quest for safety and empowerment and the Christian endeavor to atone for centuries of anti-Semitism have united to suppress the conversations needed to bring peace....Describing the spiritual and psychological forces driving the discourse in America, in Israel, within the Jewish community, and within the church, Braverman turns to the prophets’ cry for justice and to Jesus’ transformative ministry to show the way forward.” He himself has said that Fatal Embrace was “written as a result of my shock, my horror, my sadness, and my anger at what is happening in historic Palestine” – namely, the “my people, in my name,” were “dispossessing and humiliating another people.” In the book, he says, he seeks to convince Jews that they have no right to “colonize” Palestine and to convince Christians that they have not only a right but an obligation to challenge this “colonization.”

Braverman published A Wall in Jerusalem: Hope, Healing and the Struggle for Justice in Israel and Palestine in 2013.

Author Sara Roy called Fatal Embrace “courageous, provocative, and greatly deserving of our attention.” Richard Falk, UN Special Rapporteur for Human Rights in the Occupied Palestinian Territories, called it “essential reading for all who genuinely care about the future of Israel and the suffering of the Palestinian people.” And Stephen Walt, co-author of The Israel Lobby and U.S. Foreign Policy, said “Braverman points the way to a future that respects past tragedies but is not imprisoned by them,” maintaining that “both Jews and Christians have much to learn from this thoughtful, courageous, and deeply personal book.”

The foreword to Braverman's book, Fatal Embrace: Christians, Jews and the Search for Peace in the Holy Land, was written by Old Testament scholar Walter Brueggemann, a member of the United Church of Christ and professor emeritus at Columbia Theological Seminary. Brueggemann described the book as “a courageous, evocative book...with a critical edge and an urgent summons.” He noted that Braverman's central thesis is “that it is Israel's elemental conviction about being God's one chosen people...that is the root cause of the conflict” between it and the Palestinians.” In other words, the book is, at heart, “a critique of [Jewish] exceptionalism” as a tribal concept “that is no longer viable in a pluralistic world.”
