= Naim Ateek =

Palestinian-American priest (born 1937)

The Reverend Naim Ateek
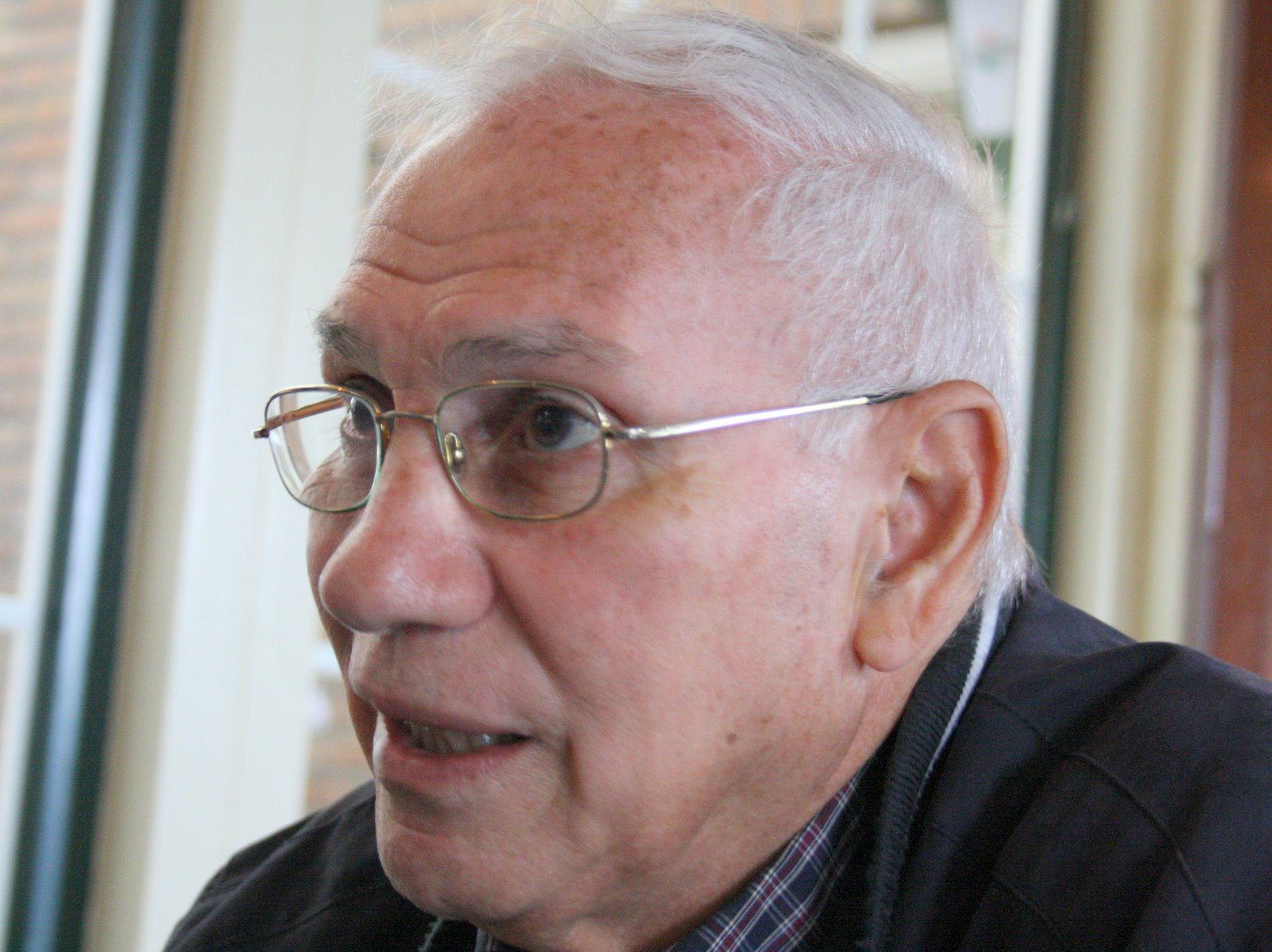
- Born: 1937 (age 88–89); Beit She'an, Mandatory Palestine
- Education: Hardin–Simmons University; Church Divinity School of the Pacific
- Occupation: Priest

Ecclesiastical career
- Religion: Christianity
- Church: Episcopal Church in Jerusalem and the Middle East
- Ordained: 1966 (deacon); 1967 (priest)

Naim Stifan Ateek (Arabic: نعيم عتيق, romanized: Na`īm `Ateeq) (born 1937) is a Palestinian priest in the Anglican Communion and founder of the Sabeel Ecumenical Liberation Theology Center in Jerusalem. He has been an active leader in the shaping of the Palestinian liberation theology.

Ateek was the first to articulate a Palestinian theology of liberation, by way of his book Justice, and only Justice, a Palestinian Theology of Liberation. Published in 1989, it was based on his dissertation. The book laid the foundation of a theology that addresses the conflict over Palestine and explores the political as well as the religious, biblical and theological dimensions. A former canon of St. George's Cathedral, Jerusalem, he lectures widely both at home and abroad. His book, A Palestinian Christian Cry for Reconciliation, was published in 2008, followed by A Palestinian Theology of Liberation in 2017.

== Early life and education ==
Born in 1937 in the Palestinian village of Beisan, Ateek moved with his family to Nazareth in 1948. He has said that Beisan (also known as Beit She'an) was destroyed by Israeli forces, turning his family into refugees. The family was originally Eastern Orthodox, but later became Anglican.

He was ordained as a priest in the Anglican Communion in 1967. Ateek had earned his BA degree from Hardin-Simmons University, Abilene, Texas, in 1963, and his Master of Divinity degree in 1966 from the Church Divinity School of the Pacific (CDSP), Berkeley, California. In 1985 he completed his doctoral studies at San Francisco Theological Seminary.

Ateek has also received honorary Doctors of Divinity from the Church Divinity School of the Pacific, Berkeley, California, and the Episcopal Divinity School in Cambridge, Massachusetts; and the distinguished alumni award from San Francisco Theological Seminary. In 2006, Ateek received the Sayre award from the Episcopal Peace Fellowship USA.

== Career ==
Ateek served as Canon of St. George's Cathedral in Jerusalem and as parish priest in Haifa and Nazareth. In 1991 he founded the Sabeel Ecumenical Liberation Theology Center in Jerusalem.

=== The Sabeel Ecumenical Liberation Theology Center ===
The Sabeel Ecumenical Liberation Theology Center (also known simply as Sabeel), headquartered in Jerusalem, describes itself as "an ecumenical grassroots liberation theology movement among Palestinian Christians", which "encourages Christians from around the world to work for justice and to stand in solidarity with the Palestinian people".

One source traces the founding of Sabeel to a 1989 meeting at which "an ecumenical ad hoc committee of ten clergy and lay theologians" discusses "ways of fostering liberation theology among Palestinian Christians". The meeting led to an international conference in March 1990, organized with the help of the Mennonite Central Committee, which in turn led to the 1991 book Faith and the Intifada, co-edited by Ateek. These developments culminated in the 1994 founding of Sabeel, which held an international conference in 1996, leading to the creation of Friends of Sabeel.

Sabeel's stated vision is "to make the gospel relevant ecumenically and spiritually in the lives of the local indigenous Church.... following in the footsteps of Christ means standing for the oppressed, working for justice, and seeking peace-building opportunities, and it challenges us to empower local Christians." Sabeel preaches a Palestinian liberation theology, which "hopes to connect the true meaning of Christian faith with the daily lives of all those who suffer under occupation, violence, discrimination, and human rights violations. Friends of Sabeel – North America's (FOSNA) states: "Liberation theologies recognize that faith addresses the whole of personal and social life from a faith perspective. Thus a Palestinian liberation theology necessarily addresses the political and social systems that are obstructing justice and reconciliation between Israelis and Palestinians and seeks to change those toward social and political patterns that will express just relationships."

In a page devoted to Palestinian Liberation Theology, FOSNA states that the theology has "10 characteristics", among which are the following: it is "contextual", "ecumenical", "interfaith", "a theology of non-violence", "not identified with any one political party", and a critic of Christian Zionism.

== Theology ==
=== Disagreement with Zionist interpretations of the Hebrew Bible ===
Ateek outlined his disagreement with what he sees as Zionist interpretations of the Hebrew Bible in his 1989 book, Justice, and Only Justice: A Palestinian Theology of Liberation:

"Before the creation of the State [of Israel], the Old Testament was considered to be an essential part of Christian Scripture, pointing and witnessing to Jesus. Since the creation of the State, some Jewish and Christian interpreters have read the Old Testament largely as a Zionist text to such an extent that it has become almost repugnant to Palestinian Christians […] The fundamental question of many Christians, whether uttered or not, is: How can the Old Testament be the Word of God in light of the Palestinian Christians' experience with its use to support Zionism?.

=== Ateek's internal struggle with the Israel issue ===
In the book, Ateek also explained how he struggled to reconcile various dichotomies posed by his faith, beliefs and identity:

"As a boy, remembering my family's harsh exile from Beisan, and later, as a person of faith and a clergyman, my own struggles with hate, anger, and humiliation were not easy. But these feelings had to be challenged continuously by the demands of love and forgiveness. At the same time, I knew without a doubt that injustice is sinful and evil; that it is an outrage against God; and that it is my duty to cry out against it. It has taken me years to accept the establishment of the State of Israel and its need- although not its right - to exist. I now feel that I want it to stay, because I believe that the elimination of Israel would mean greater injustice to millions of innocent people who know no home except Israel. This does not suggest that the Old Testament is not the Word of God, but how can it be understood as that if a Zionist theology of the Old Testament is accepted by Christian groups?"

== Views regarding Palestine and the Israeli occupation ==
=== Views on Israel and Zionism ===
In 1989, in Justice, and Only Justice, Ateek wrote, "The preservation of Israel as a Jewish state is important not only to Israeli Jews but to Jews all over the world. I believe that we must honor their wish and accept it. In fact, the Palestinians should eventually guarantee the survival of Israel by accepting it as a Jewish state".

=== Kairos Palestine Document ===
In December 2009, Sabeel endorsed the Kairos Palestine Document (KPD), which calls on Christians throughout the world to join the 2005 call of Palestinian civil society to utilize boycotts, divestment, and sanctions to pressure Israel's government to end occupation, human rights violations, and illegal settlement of Palestinian land. The document, whose stated goal is to communicate the truth about the Arab–Israeli conflict to the world, was drafted by a group, among them Patriarch Michel Sabah, Rev. Mitri Raheb, Rifat Odeh Kassis, Rev. Ateek and others. The 2009 "Kairos Palestine" document has been described as echoing Ateek's own "Justice and Only Justice".

=== "Morally responsible investment" ===
The term "morally responsible investment" came into widespread use as a result of a 2006 paper by Ateek, "A Call for Morally Responsible Investment: A Nonviolent Response to the Occupation", which has been described as "the central text of the pro-divestment movement".

=== "The Jerusalem Sabeel Document" ===
"The Jerusalem Sabeel Document: Principles for a Just Peace in Palestine–Israel" is one of the foundational documents of the organization. It calls for "one state for two nations and three religions".

=== Use of Christian imagery ===
In his 2001 Easter message Ateek stated, in part:

As we approach Holy Week and Easter, the suffering of Jesus Christ at the hands of evil political and religious powers two thousand years ago is lived out again in Palestine. The number of innocent Palestinians and Israelis that have fallen victim to Israeli state policy is increasing.

Here in Palestine Jesus is again walking the via dolorosa. Jesus is the powerless Palestinian humiliated at a checkpoint, the woman trying to get through to the hospital for treatment, the young man whose dignity is trampled, the young student who cannot get to the university to study, the unemployed father who needs to find bread to feed his family; the list is tragically getting longer, and Jesus is there in their midst suffering with them. He is with them when their homes are shelled by tanks and helicopter gunships. He is with them in their towns and villages, in their pains and sorrows.

In this season of Lent, it seems to many of us that Jesus is on the cross again with thousands of crucified Palestinians around him. It only takes people of insight to see the hundreds of thousands of crosses throughout the land, Palestinian men, women, and children being crucified. Palestine has become one huge golgotha. The Israeli government crucifixion system is operating daily. Palestine has become the place of the skull.

Using the Gospel story one can put it in a different and still very poignant way. Four things are clear today. Jerusalem still does not know what makes for peace; Jesus is weeping and his tears are mixed with many other people's tears; the number of people who are carrying their crosses is multiplying phenomenally; and the women of Palestine as well as many Jewish women are weeping over the many killed and wounded innocents. This is the reality of life today.

=== Condemnation of suicide attacks ===
In a 2003 document on suicide bombings, Ateek condemns suicide attacks but emphasizes they are the result of Israeli occupation. "If Israel labels them as terrorists", he wrote, "they are, after all, the product of its own making."

== Books ==
- Ateek, Naim Stifan (2017). A Palestinian Theology of Liberation. Maryknoll, New York: Orbis Books. ISBN 978-1-62698-260-4.
- Ateek, Naim Stifan (2008). A Palestinian Christian Cry for Reconciliation. Maryknoll, New York: Orbis Books. ISBN 978-1-57075-784-6.
- Ateek, Naim; Cedar Duaybis; Maurine Tobin, eds. (2005). Challenging Christian Zionism. Melisende. ISBN 1-901764-42-7.
- Ateek, Naim; Hilary Rantisi, eds. (1999). Our Story the Palestinians. Jerusalem: Sabeel Ecumenical Liberation Theology Center.
- Ateek, Naim (1999). Holy Land Hollow Jubilee: God, Justice and the Palestinians. London: Melisende. ISBN 1-901764-09-5.
- Ateek, Naim; Cedar Duaybis; Marla Schrader, eds. (1997). Jerusalem – What Makes for Peace!: Palestinian Christian Contribution to Peacemaking. London, United Kingdom: Melisende. ISBN 1-901764-00-1.
- Ateek, Naim S.; Marc H. Ellis; Rosemary Radford Ruether, eds. (1992). Faith and the Intifada: Palestinian Christian Voices. Maryknoll, New York: Orbis Books. ISBN 0-88344-808-4.
- Ateek, Naim Stifan (1989). Justice, and Only Justice: A Palestinian Theology of Liberation. Maryknoll, New York: Orbis Books. ISBN 978-0-88344-545-7.

== Supporters ==
Among Ateek's Jewish supporters are Jeff Halper, founder of the Israeli Committee Against House Demolitions; Jewish Liberation theologian Marc H. Ellis; clinical psychologist Mark Braverman; and American rabbi, journalist, and author Brant Rosen.

== See also ==
- Episcopal Church in Jerusalem and the Middle East
- Palestinian Christians
- Political theology in the Middle East
- Riah Abu El-Assal

== Sources ==
- Ateek, Naim (September–October 2001). "Unmasking False Religion: Following Jesus in occupied territory". Sojourners Magazine. 30 (5): 27.
- The Theology of Sabeel: What We Believe: Notes from a talk by Rev. Naim Ateek, July 21, 2008, Milwaukie, Oregon
- Butt, Gerald (28 September 2000). "Jerusalem: Eternal, intractable". BBC.
- Grieves, Brian (September 2001). "A journey of justice, a journey of faith: An interview with Naim Ateek". Witness. Archived from the original on 10 September 2002.
- Tutu, Desmond (29 April 2002). "Apartheid in the Holy Land". The Guardian.
