= Theodosios Hanna =

Palestinian archbishop of the Greek Church

His Beatitude Theodosios
- Archbishop of Sebastia
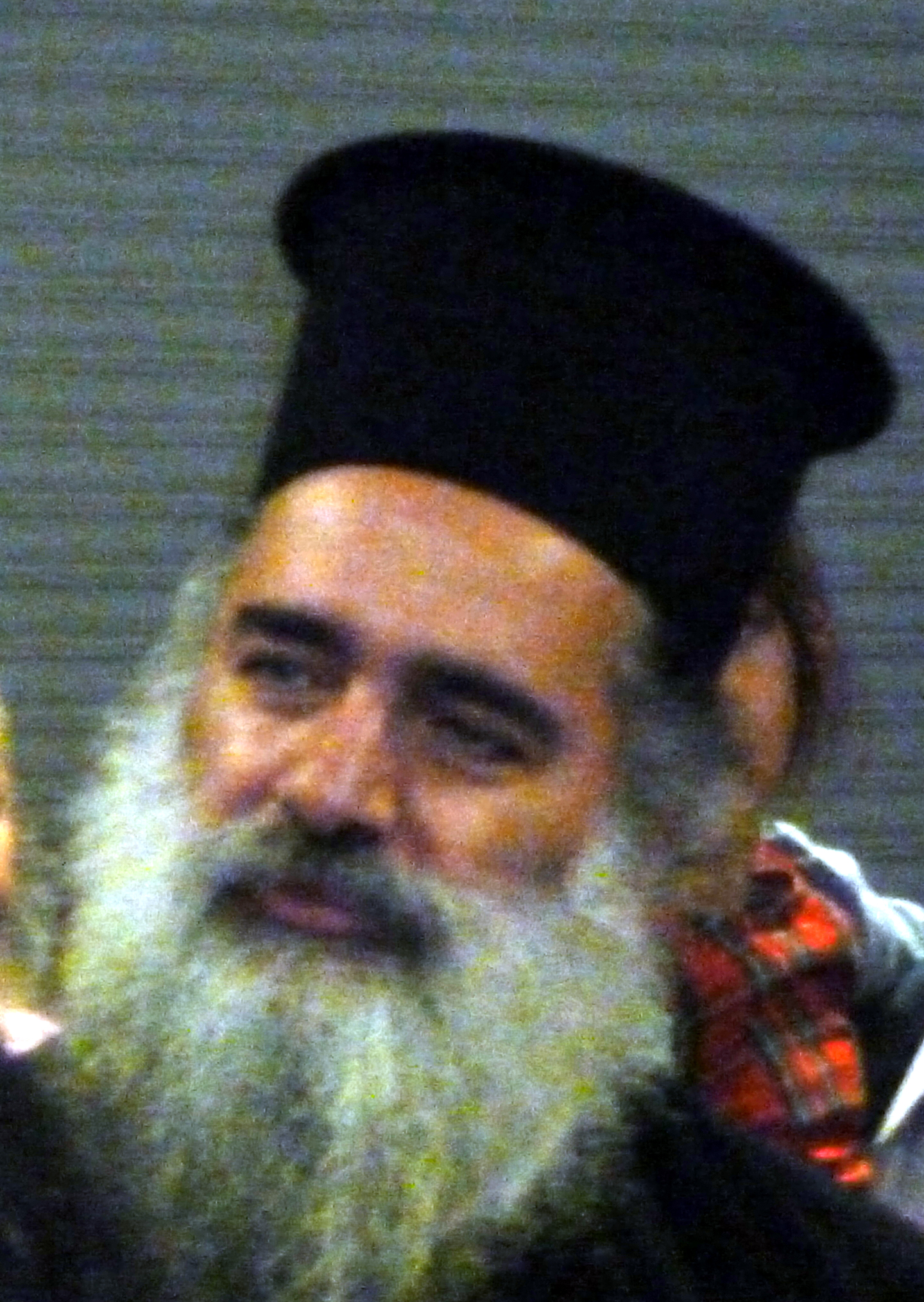
- Theodosios in 2014
- Church: Greek Orthodox Church of Jerusalem
- See: Sebastia
- Installed: 24 December 2005

Personal details
- Born: Nizar Hanna; 1965 (age 60–61) Rameh, Upper Galilee, Israel

Theodosios of Sebastia (born Nizar Hanna; 1965), popularly known as Atallah Hanna (Arabic: عطالله حنا), is a Palestinian Christian prelate who has served as Archbishop of Sebastia for the Greek Orthodox Patriarchate of Jerusalem since 2005. He is the second Palestinian archbishop in the history of the diocese. He is one of relatively few Christian prelates in the Middle East to have referred to Israeli actions in the Gaza war as a genocide.

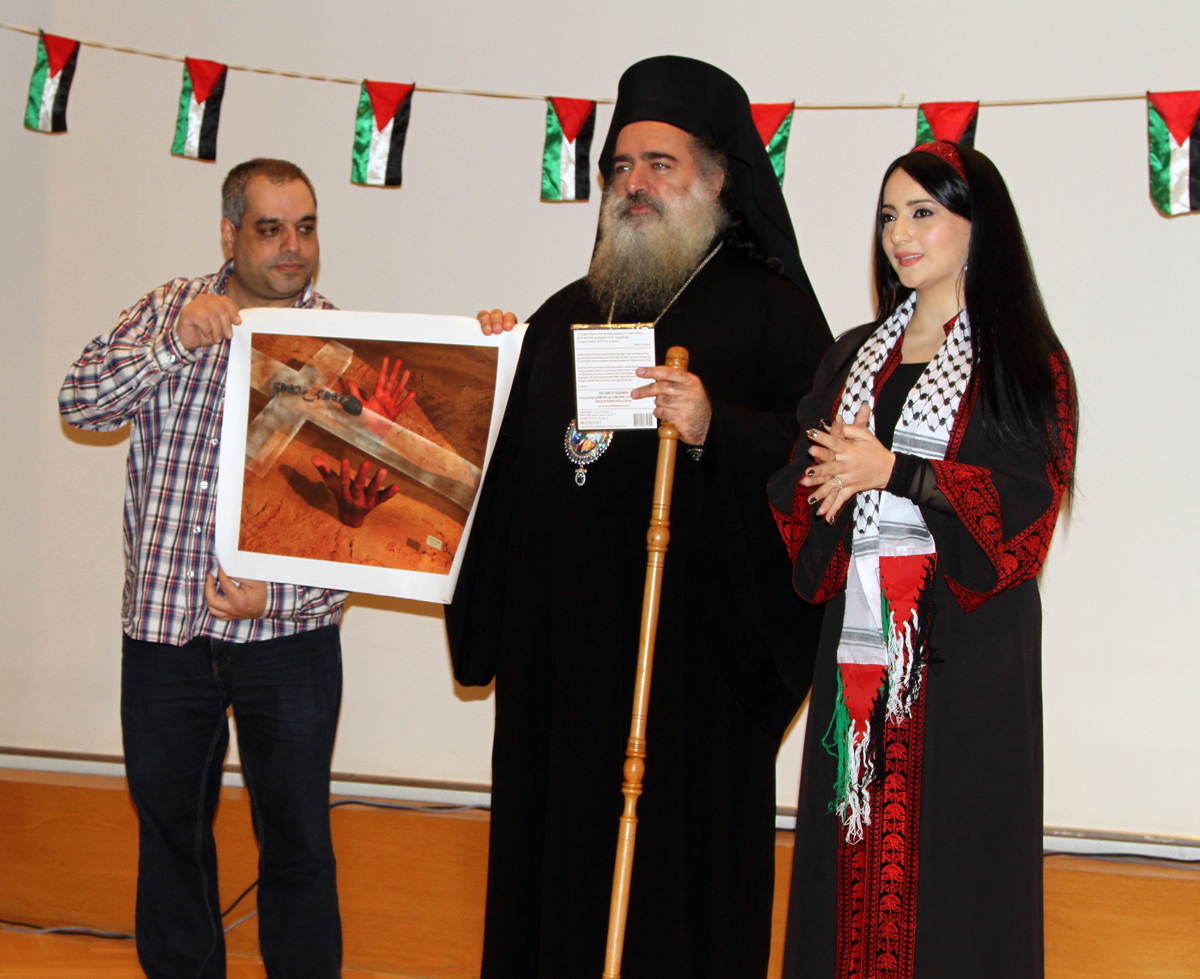
The Palestinian filmmaker and artist Hisham Zreiq honors the Archbishop of Sebastia Theodosios (Atallah Hanna), and the Palestinian singer Manal Mousa by giving each of them one of his artworks during Palestinian Land Day celebration in Dortmund, Germany

== Biography ==
=== Early life and education ===
Archbishop Theodosios was born Nizar Hanna to Eastern Orthodox parents in the village of Rameh, Upper Galilee region of northern Israel.

Archbishop Theodosios studied Greek in Jerusalem, continuing his studies in Greece where he earned his Master of Theology from University of Thessalonica School of Theology in 1991.

=== Early career ===
In 1991, Hanna returned to Jerusalem, where he was tonsured a monk with the name Theodosios and received ordination as a deacon. Also in 1991 he was elected a member of the Brotherhood of the Holy Sepulchre. In 1992, Theodosios was ordained a priest at the Church of the Holy Sepulchre. A few days later he was elevated to the rank of archimandrite and placed in charge of the Arab section of the Patriarchate.

Active in public life, he has served as the spokesperson and Director of the Patriarchate's Arab Department, has taught in local schools, and lectured on Christianity at the Haifa Arab Teachers' College. For his devotion to ministry in the Holy Land, Theodosios was granted an honorary Doctor of Theology degree from the Sofia Theological Institute in Bulgaria.

In 2001 Theodosios was appointed by the late Patriarch Diodoros to serve as the official spokesperson for the Greek Orthodox Patriarchate in Jerusalem.

=== Activism ===
Theodosios gained renown for his high-profile political activism, his outspoken denunciation of the Israeli occupation, and his stress upon the importance of Palestinian identity - positions that have made him popular with Palestinians and other Arabs and unpopular with the Israeli authorities. He considers the whole of the Palestinian people to be his church.

Theodosios has served as a member of the Constitutional Consultative Committee that worked on the third draft of the Palestinian constitution of March 2003 and was awarded the Jerusalem Prize by the Palestinian National Authority's Ministry of Culture in 2004. He is also one of the authors of the Kairos Palestine document together with Patriarch Michel Sabah, Naim Ateeq, Rifat Odeh Kassis, Nora Qort and others.

==== During the Second Intifada ====
Theodosios represented Greek Orthodox Patriarch of Jerusalem Diodoros as part of a Palestinian ecumenical delegation invited by the World Council of Churches (WCC) to present before the United Nations Commission on Human Rights. At the WCC's Geneva headquarters on 19 October 2000, he stated that Palestinian Christians "are suffering, because they are Palestinians and they want to stay in their homeland in Palestine". Theodosios also accused Israel of practicing "ethnic cleansing against the Arabs, Muslim and Christian. Everyone thinks that there is a conflict between Arabs and Israelis. It is not a conflict between Arabs and Israelis, but an occupation by Israel." He called on all WCC churches to hold a special prayer for the Palestinian people and stated that they "should be enjoying all the rights of any other nation ... and should be enjoying their independence in their own state, the capital of which is Jerusalem."

The following year, on 10 October 2001, Theodosios participated with other Christian and Muslim leaders in a march from Jerusalem to the Bethlehem checkpoint to protest Israeli attacks on religious sites. Theodosios explained that, "We intend to conduct special prayers inside the Church of the Nativity for the sake of our martyrs."

Later that month, Theodosios sent a message to the United Nations Human Rights Commission calling for "immediate and rapid intervention" by the United Nations "to save the Palestinian people from the terrible massacres being carried out by the occupation forces". He also called for the commission to pressure Israel to lift its blockade of Palestinian towns and villages.

On 21 January 2002, Israel requested that the Greek Orthodox Patriarchate take punitive action against him for criticizing Israeli policy in the Occupied Palestinian Territory. In March 2002, the Greek Orthodox Patriarchate in Jerusalem issued a statement expressing "denunciation and condemnation over Israel's suspension of Archimandrite Dr. Atallah Hanna at King Hussein bridge between Jordan and the West Bank upon his return from Beirut, for five hours in a very racist and provocative way." The patriarchy also expressed its regret over the demand of the Israeli government that Theodosios be fired from his position as church spokesperson, considering this measure to be "a grave violation to its sovereignty in running its affairs."

In July 2002, two years into the Second Intifada, Greek Orthodox Patriarch of Jerusalem Irenaios I accused Theodosios of "supporting the Palestinian terrorism," after he refused to sign a document condemning Palestinian operations. Irenaios also fired Theodosios from his post as spokesperson for the church. The Arab Orthodox community responded by issuing an urgent statement calling on the Greek Foreign Ministry to intervene, stressing that Theodosios would remain the spokesperson for the church with or without Greek acceptance. Arab Orthodox figures urged the Orthodox Arab Christian communities in Palestine and Jordan to boycott the Greek Patriarch. The Father Theodosios Atallah Hanna Defense Committee was formed to mobilize on his behalf.

==== Arrest and confiscation of travel documents ====
On 22 August 2002, Theodosios was arrested outside of his home in the Old City of Jerusalem by Israeli Border Police on the order of Attorney General Elyakim Rubinstein. He was taken to the police station at the Russian Compound where he was charged with "suspicion of relations with terrorist organisations", "illegally entering an enemy country" (i.e. Syria and Lebanon) and "incitement". Media were present at the site of his interrogation which lasted five hours. Theodosios explained that he regularly visited Syria and Lebanon to attend religious and inter-religious conferences and dialogues using his Vatican passport. Israeli police confiscated Theodosios' Israeli and Vatican-issued passports.

Upon his release, Theodosios claimed that his arrest had been unjustified since "he had only expressed opposition to Israel's military occupation of areas claimed by the Palestinians." In an interview with Palestine Chronicle in September 2002, Theodosios said that his arrest marked "the first time that a Christian religious leader and official is arrested in such an inhumane and non-acceptable manner that is devoid of all human ethics and without any prior notification."

Sharing his view as to the reasons for his arrest, he said that:

In the past three months, a far-reaching defamation campaign was launched against me in a number of Israeli newspapers accusing me of supporting terrorism and violence and condoning suicide attacks. I have a strong conviction that the slander, assault and arrest are all part of a chain of accusations meant to deliver a message to me, and the rest of the Christian and Moslem religious leaders ... The Israeli authority has launched a campaign aiming at silencing all those nationalistic voices in Jerusalem and claiming that these voices support terrorism, violence, etc. I believe that the only concerned party is the Israeli authority. In my case there could be some elements involved from within the Church itself, and this is something that I cannot disregard, especially that there are those who do not share my stance on issues pertaining to the Palestinian-Israeli conflict.

Theodosios further said that:

I believe that the act of ousting me from my position as the official spokesperson of the Church and the other measures taken are closely related to the pressure and blackmail exercised especially that the Patriarch confirmed to me months ago that I am targeted and that Israel has demanded that he oust me from my position. This is what actually happened later on based on the Israeli desire to conceal the Christian dimension of the Palestinian issue. Israel attempts to present this conflict as a Jewish-Moslem religious conflict, and it also attempts to neutralize the Christian position, and therefore it is irritated by the growing Christian voices raised on the Palestinian issue. We have always asserted that the Church in Palestine is there to serve all Palestinians for it is a church for the people. It is also a church that is deeply rooted in this land and the Arab Palestinian Christians and Moslems who live in it. We have always asserted our resistance to the Israeli pressure, and we believe that in the case of the arrest itself Israel has transgressed all borders.

Responding to the charge of visiting "enemy states", Theodosios said that:

As to the case of the visit to Syria considered by Israel an enemy country, we say that we are not bound by the Israeli stance. The number of people who belong to the Greek Orthodox Church in Syria exceeds a million and the number in Lebanon exceeds half a million. Israel has no right of preventing us from visiting Syria and Lebanon under the claim that these are enemy countries especially that we maintain spiritual and nationalistic ties with these countries. When we visit these countries we meet with all political and religious officials with no exceptions whatsoever. We are open to everyone. Israel has no right of claiming that we maintain relations with terrorist organizations because what Israel calls terrorist maybe to us nationalistic, freedom fighters. We refuse to accept the terms that Israel dictates; therefore, what Israel condemns or what it elevates may not be necessarily as such to us.

==== Legal advocacy to reclaim passports ====
On 28 October 2002, Adalah - The Legal Center for Arab Minority Rights in Israel sent a letter to the Attorney General's office on Theodosios' behalf demanding that they intervene to return both the Israeli and Vatican passports that had been confiscated from Theodosios by the Israeli police. Adalah noted that a few weeks earlier, the police had summoned Theodosios to collect his passports on the condition that he sign "a statement promising not to incite against the state or make statements in support of terrorist actions or organizations; not to visit states hostile to Israel without the permission of the Ministry of Interior; and not to contact enemy states (as defined under Israeli law) or terrorist organizations." Theodosios refused, and the police refused to return his passports.

Adalah argued that the police decision to withhold Theodosios' passports had no basis in any law and did not serve any legitimate purpose, and that the document he was asked to sign also had no legal basis and violated the Israel's domestic laws on equality. On 28 October 2002, the Attorney General sent a letter to the police legal advisor requesting his urgent reply to Adalah's letter. As of February 2005, both passports belonging to Theodosios had not yet been returned.

=== Conflict with Irenaios I and elevation to archbishop ===
In 2005, Theodosios was active in the movement to dethrone Patriarch Irenaios following allegations that land belonging to the Greek Orthodox Church had been sold to Zionist Jewish organizations. After the election of Patriarch Theophilos III in 2005, Theodosios was appointed and ordained as Archbishop of Sebastia. He is the second Palestinian to hold the position of archbishop in the history of the diocese.

=== On Christian Zionism ===
In a March 2022 interview, Archbishop Theodosios criticised the idea of Christian Zionism, saying that the Greek Orthodox Church "does not recognise" the term, calling it "alien" to Christian values:

Just because a group in America calls itself Christian and advocates for Zionism, does not mean they represent Christianity. It also does not mean we should adopt this false terminology in our writings and teachings [...] We do not recognize this so-called Christian Zionism because Christianity is a religion that calls for love, peace, and for siding by the oppressed and the dispossessed wherever and whoever they are [...] However, Zionism is a completely different thing; it is a racist ideology and movement that has been the reason behind so many injustices and catastrophes inflicted on our Palestinian people [...] We denounce and reject all attempts to link Christianity with Zionism; how can Christianity, a religion that calls for compassion and love, be combined with a racist ideology, responsible for all this suppering in the Holy Land and the region [...] How can this movement claim to represent Christianity while it advocates for wars and destruction that did not spare anybody, including Christians [...] We can, for instance, refer to them as Zionist groups that allege being Christian, especially since their beliefs contradict the peaceful message of Christianity [...] These groups are harming Christianity; they can call themselves whatever they want; however, this doesn’t mean we should adopt their false terminology and ideology.

—

In 2024, Theodosios criticised US Ambassador to Israel Mike Huckabee and the Second Trump Administration for claiming to be real Christians, while having a pro-Israel stance. He stated that, if they were truly Christian, they would call for an end to the Israeli occupation of Palestine, to the Gaza War and to the Israeli occupation of Lebanon. He also declared that "Palestine is mentioned in the Bible, and instead of these racists denying the existence of Palestinians, they should work towards resolving the Palestinian issue, which is the key to peace in our region and the world".

=== On Gaza war and genocide ===
Theodosios is one of relatively few Christian prelates in the Middle East to have referred to Israeli actions in the Gaza war as a genocide. In June 2024, he accused Western leaders of being complicit in the genocide. In August 2025, he signed onto a statement from Jerusalem Voice for Justice, of which he is a member, that also referred to the genocide and said it could spread to other parts of Palestine. In October 2025, shortly after the two-year anniversary of the conflict, Theodosios published a prayer referring to it as a "War of Genocide".

== See also ==
- Palestinian Christians
- Christianity in Israel
