= Sabeel Ecumenical Liberation Theology Center =

Jerusalem-based Protestant Christian Pro-Palestine nonprofit organization

- Formation: 1989
- Founded at: Jerusalem
- Type: non-profit organization
- Location: Jerusalem
- Methods: Liberation theology, Social action
- Key people: Naim Ateek, Director
- Website: www.sabeel.org

The Sabeel Ecumenical Liberation Theology Center (sabeel is Arabic for 'the way' and also 'a channel' or 'spring') is a Christian liberation theology organization based in Jerusalem. It was founded by Palestinian Anglican priest, Rev. Naim Ateek, the former Canon of St. George's Cathedral in Jerusalem.

An official partner of the Presbyterian Church USA, Sabeel has Friends of Sabeel chapters in the United States, Canada, the United Kingdom, Sweden, Denmark, Norway, Ireland, France, Germany, the Netherlands and Australia.

According to its official website, Sabeel "strives to develop a spirituality based on love, justice, peace, nonviolence, liberation and reconciliation for the different national and faith communities." In particular, the group aims to "promote a more accurate international awareness regarding the identity, presence and witness of Palestinian Christians as well as their contemporary concerns."

Sabeel, which advocates "morally responsible investment," has been described by its critics as promoting an anti-Israel agenda, including divestment from Israel. It has also been accused of using antisemitic rhetoric. The Rev. Canon Dr. Richard K. Toll, the Chair of Friends of Sabeel—North America denies those allegations, writing that "the state of Israel is not above criticism and needs to be challenged when its policies are wrong. And its policy of occupation is wrong." Toll also says that Sabeel "consistently condemns anti-Semitism in all its ugly forms."

== Political Vision ==
=== Principles for a Just Peace ===
In 2004, Sabeel issued a document entitled Principles for Just Peace in Palestine-Israel outlining their support for a two-state solution as an immediate goal, while envisioning that it may eventually lead to a one-state solution.

The document outlines several demands made of Israel, including the need for reparations to be made to Palestinians. It further states that "No solution is acceptable if it does not guarantee the Palestinians’ and Israelis’ right to self-determination, independence, and sovereignty" and calls for "a peace treaty… between the two states of Palestine and Israel guaranteeing the full sovereignty and territorial integrity of each including recognized borders, water rights, and other resources."

The Genuine Hope: Two sovereign and fully democratic states

This scenario envisages the total withdrawal of Israel from all the occupied territories including East Jerusalem according to United Nations resolutions 242 and 338. The Palestinians will establish their sovereign state on the whole of the 23% of the land of Palestine...

As to Jerusalem, it will have to be shared. The city must remain open to all. A peace treaty will be drawn up and the two countries will become inter-dependent economically and will help each other develop their resources for the well being of both their peoples. . .

The Vision for the Future Our vision involves two sovereign states, Palestine and Israel, who in the future may choose to enter into a confederation or even a federation, possibly with other neighboring countries and where Jerusalem becomes the federal capital. Indeed, the ideal and best solution has always been to envisage ultimately a bi-national state in Palestine-Israel where people are free and equal, living under a constitutional democracy that protects and guarantees all their rights, responsibilities, and duties without racism or discrimination. One state for two nations and three religions.

In December 2009, Sabeel endorsed the Kairos Palestine Document, "a prayerful call by Palestinians Christians to end the Occupation". Based on the 1985 South African Kairos Document, Palestinian clergy called to the churches of the world for "a moment of truth: a word of faith, hope and love from the heart of the Palestinian suffering."

== Program ==
Community Building Program

Sabeel's Community Building Program seeks to educate the public about the Israeli-Palestinian conflict, to foster "a sense of solidarity", and to contribute to the community's spiritual growth.

Youth Program

Sabeel's Youth Program "provides opportunities for young people from different churches to meet and get to know each other" and "educates and empowers youth to be future Church and Civic leaders".

Women's Program

Sabeel's Women's Program "encourages networks of women, fosters inclusivity, broadens knowledge of existing support resources, and educates women on their spiritual history and their responsibility as Christian women".

Witness Visits

Sabeel offers regular "witness visits" to the Holy Land for Christian clergy. The trips provide them with an opportunity to meet, talk, and worship with Palestinian Christians and others who oppose the Israeli occupation. The clergy members are able to experience "the Separation Wall, illegal settlements, checkpoints, confiscated and demolished homes, refugee camps, and environmental degradation".

Wave of Prayer

Each Thursday at noon in Jerusalem, Sabeel holds an ecumenical Communion service that is open to the community.

Cornerstone

Sabeel also publishes a quarterly English-language newspaper Cornerstone, which "highlights Sabeel's ministry activities both locally and internationally as well as theological reflections on contemporary social and political events".

== Friends of Sabeel ==
Sabeel describes Friends of Sabeel – North America (FOSNA) as "a nonprofit, tax-exempt Christian ecumenical organization seeking justice and peace in the Holy Land through non-violence and education". It works in the U.S. and Canada to support the vision of Sabeel. It cultivates the support of American churches through co-sponsored regional educational conferences, alternative pilgrimage, witness trips, and international gatherings in the Holy Land. Friends of Sabeel chapters also exist in Canada, the United Kingdom, Sweden, Denmark, Norway, Ireland, France, Germany, the Netherlands, and Australia.

In 2010, Friends of Sabeel-North America circulated a list of ten companies to boycott titled “All I want for Christmas is an End to Apartheid,” stating that “While there are many Israeli and multinational companies that benefit from apartheid, we put together this list to highlight ten specific companies to target.”

1. Ahava
2. Delta Galil Industries
3. Motorola
4. L'Oreal / The Body Shop
5. Dorot Garlic and Herbs
6. Estee Lauder
7. Intel
8. Sabra
9. Sara Lee
10. Victoria's Secret

== Mixed Support from different Christian denominations ==
Sabeel has sent representatives to several denominational gatherings in the United States and has advocated for divestment resolutions, which it sees as a non-violent approach to resisting the occupation. It has met with some success. The Presbyterian Church (USA) has passed divestment resolutions based on information provided by Sabeel. All of the major mainline denominations, including the United Church of Christ, the United Methodist Church, the Evangelical Lutheran Church in America and the Episcopal Church, have discussed divestment and the possibility of using the money in their pension funds and endowments to exert pressure for peace in the Middle East.

In February 2006, the World Council of Churches (WCC) commended the actions of the Presbyterian Church (USA) and urged other member churches worldwide to consider economic measures to end Israel's occupation. Salpy Eskidjian Weiderud, former special consultant to the Geneva-based WCC General Secretary on Palestine and Israel, has noted that support for divestment by the WCC governing body came in the backdrop of a history of "bold statements since 1948 on its Israel/Palestine policy", and was a way of ensuring "that it is not in any way contributing financially to what it says is illegal or immoral."

The Episcopal Church, The United Church of Christ and others have passed Sabeel-influenced resolutions urging Israel to dismantle the separation barrier and end its occupation of the Palestinian territories.

Other groups within these denominations have rejected and opposed these resolutions. Rev. David Runnion-Bareford of the Biblical Witness Fellowship issued an apology to Jewish people after the United Church of Christ issues their 2005 resolution. He also accused "an ad hoc group made up of Sabeel representatives and UCC officials" of becoming unduly involved in the resolution process. The PCUSA resolution also created much controversy, leading to a 2006 Synod renouncing the resolution that was made under the consultation of Sabeel.

== Criticism ==
In addition to the mainline opposition groups that have formed as a result of Sabeel's activity, there have been other groups that have opposed either Sabeel's goals or their manner of speaking their message. In some cases, groups have accused Sabeel of extremism and antisemitism. Sabeel's most vocal critics are listed below with their most significant criticisms also listed.

=== Coe College ===
The chair of the Department of Philosophy and Religion at Coe College (Iowa), which had co-sponsored a campus conference with a group of American supporters of Sabeel, acknowledged in a letter to a local rabbi that anti-Semitic remarks had been made at the conference. The chair wrote "We regret any harm that may have been caused by such anti-Semitic statements", but later told journalists covering the story that his letter was not an apology, and that it was deliberately vague because he was unsure exactly which comments could be considered anti-Semitic.

=== Stephen Roth Institute ===
The Israeli Stephen Roth Institute claimed that Sabeel "commonly engages in blatant propaganda seeking to isolate and demonize Israel, while delegitimizing the right of the Jewish state to exist." Sabeel responded that "It accepts the presence of Israel in the land that was once Palestine and asks that the two peoples be allowed to live together in this land as equals with full rights for people of both groups.".

=== Dexter Van Zile, CAMERA, and Judeo-Christian Alliance ===
Dexter Van Zile, Christian Media Analyst for the pro-Israel media-monitoring group CAMERA, has accused Ateek of trafficking in the anti-Semitic canard of Jewish deicide:

Ateek’s ‘theology’ embraces the old anti-Jewish teachings that every responsible church – Protestant and Catholic – has officially renounced fifty years ago...

Not only does Ateek deny Israel’s right to exist, he traffics in anti-Judaic imagery that has been taboo since the Holocaust...

In his 2001 Easter Message, Ateek wrote the ‘Israeli government crucifixion system is operating daily’ and likened the occupation to the stone blocking Christ’s tomb. In a February 2001 sermon, Ateek compared Israeli officials to Herod (the baby killer). The implication is undeniable: Israel is a baby- and Christ-killing nation that stands in the way of humanity’s salvation.

Given the role this imagery has played in promoting violence against Jews, and its use in reference to the Jewish state is inexcusable.

Van Zile bases these accusations on fragments from Ateek's 2001 Easter message, such as, “in this season of Lent, it seems to many of us that Jesus is on the cross again with thousands of crucified Palestinians around Him ...The Israeli government crucifixion system is operating daily,". Similarly, in a February 2001 sermon, Ateek likened the occupation to the “stone placed on the entrance of Jesus’ tomb. ... This boulder has shut in the Palestinians within and built structures of domination to keep them in. We have a name for this boulder. It is called the occupation.”

Sabeel's comparisons of Palestinians to the crucified Jesus and Israel to his murderers is also rejected by the ADL as an "ugly and false deicide charge against all the Jewish people - a concept rejected by prominent historians and repudiated by the Roman Catholic Church and other Christian denominations."

The Judeo-Christian Alliance has also promoted Van Zile's paper, entitled "Sabeel's One State Agenda", claiming that Sabeel has failed to draw attention to the mistreatment of Christians by Muslim extremists in areas under the control of the Palestinian Authority. Van Zile also accused Ateek of breathing new life into what French historian Jules Isaac called the “teachings of contempt” and having directed their "vile energy" toward the Jewish State.

Sabeel disagrees with these characterizations of their beliefs and actions. They have published a statement affirming their belief that the ancient Jews were not responsible for the death of Jesus, and that neither Palestinians nor Israelis have a "vocation for suffering" that requires either people to be stateless.

=== Anti-Defamation League ===
The Anti-Defamation League (ADL), in a backgrounder article on Sabeel, accused the organization of "generating hostility towards Israel" citing "its use of theologically charged accusations" as belying "its professed passion for reconciliation." The ADL further submitted that, "Sabeel rejects Zionism on theological grounds. It has promoted the idea that Zionism is based on a false reading of the Bible and that it stands for injustice and in opposition to God."

=== Criticism of, and support for Old South Church ===
The Boston Globe's conservative columnist Jeff Jacoby criticized Boston's historic Old South Church, a congregation of the United Church of Christ, for hosting the Most Reverend Doctor Desmond Tutu as part of that church's Engaging Three Faiths spiritual dialog series, and Sabeel's Apartheid Paradigm in Palestine-Israel conference. Jacoby argued that "Sabeel and Ateek's denunciations of Israel have included imagery explicitly linking the modern Jewish state to the terrible charge that for centuries fueled so much anti-Jewish hatred and bloodshed" and that "In Ateek's metaphorical telling, in other words, Israel is guilty of trying to murder Jesus as an infant, of killing Jesus on the cross, and of seeking to prevent his resurrection."

Rabbi Arthur Waskow, director of the Shalom Center, and Rabbi Howard A. Berman, founder of Jewish Spirit have expressed support for, and are participants in Old South Church's Engaging Three Faiths series.

During his presentation at Old South Church on October 28, 2007, Waskow raised concerns about Sabeel's use of crucifixion imagery in reference to Israel. Waskow said that in Latin America, Christian liberation theologians often "talk about the crucifixion of Jesus by the Roman Empire ... and from their view point of course the resurrection of the Christ as teaching of what it means to transcend imperial power, in the Latin American context it's clear that the empire you're talking about is America and it makes sense."

Waskow said that Sabeel may think it's doing the same thing when it talks about the crucifixion of Jesus, but "when you are doing it in the context of a Jewish state, when you're doing it in the context of 2000 years of Jewish suffering from the Christian dogma of deicide that the Jews killed God and the violence that has been visited on the Jewish community by people upholding that theology, to hear that strikes a nerve that has 2000 years of pain behind it and that has to be heard."

=== Sabeel's Responses to Frequently Asked Questions ===
Sabeel has posted responses to questions about its policies and theology at http://fosna.org/faq.

In October, 2010, the Anti-Defamation League issued its list of "the top 10 anti-Israel groups in America" and included Friends of Sabeel–North America (FOSNA) and Jewish Voice for Peace among them.

Friends of Sabeel– North America posted a response to the Anti-Defamation League saying that Fosna did not consider its criticism of Israeli government policies "anti-Israeli" and that to the extent those policies are unjust and violate international law, they jeopardize Israel's future.

=== Connection to Protestant Church in the Netherlands ===
A Protestant church in the Netherlands supported organization, Kerk in Actie, employs a representative in Israel, who is working at Sabeel in Jerusalem, promoting the Kairos Palestine document and the Boycott, Divestment and Sanctions campaign against Israel.

The synod of the Protestant Church in the Netherlands, in regards to the Gaza Flotilla supported by Sabeel, said, "We are not responsible for the political views that Sabeel or their employees promote, but we are engaged in a dialogue with them on this issue."

== See also ==
- Liberation theology
- Palestinian Christians
