= Presbyterian Church (U.S.A.) Hezbollah controversy =

The Presbyterian Church (USA) Hezbollah controversy began following a series of statements made by church representatives in 2004.

== Background ==
In October 2004, the Presbyterian Church USA (PCUSA) Advisory Committee on Social Wellness Policy toured the Middle East in order to listen to local Christians, ecumenical partners, and political leaders in Lebanon, the Palestinian National Authority, Israel, Egypt and Jordan. While in Lebanon, the delegation met with members of Hezbollah, which became a cause of controversy.

== Controversy ==
Ronald H. Stone, John Witherspoon Professor of Christian Ethics at Pittsburgh Theological Seminary, attracted negative media attention during the tour after being quoted as saying, "We treasure the precious words of Hezbollah and your expression of goodwill toward the American people. Also we praise your initiative for dialogue and mutual understanding. We cherish these statements that bring us closer to you. As an elder of our church, I'd like to say that according to my recent experience, relations and conversations with Islamic leaders are a lot easier than dealings and dialogue with Jewish leaders."

A member of the delegation, Reverend Nile Harper, stated that "The occupation by Israel in the West Bank and Gaza must end because it is oppressive and destructive for the Palestinian people".

=== Reaction ===
The Anti-Defamation League (ADL) criticized the meeting as irresponsible, and stated that it was "deeply disturbing that leaders of the Presbyterian Church would seek out a meeting with members of a terrorist organization responsible for attacks that have killed both Americans and Israelis." Members of the General Advisory Council later issued a letter to the ADL indicating that the meeting was "misguided, at best" and the comments of "Presbyterians there, as we understand them, are reprehensible." The ADL "welcomed the statement as an acceptable response … to the meeting with Hezbollah."

Two PCUSA staff members responsible for organizing the meetings with Hezbollah were fired. The Louisville Courier-Journal, in an article dated November 12, 2004, reported that

"Two high-level Presbyterian Church (USA) employees have been fired in the aftermath of their taking part in a controversial meeting with a representative of Hezbollah...Kathy Leuckert, Deputy Executive Associate Director of the General Assembly Council, and Peter Sulyok, Coordinator of the Advisory Committee on Social Witness Policy, were notified that they were no longer employed by the Presbyterian Church (USA) according to a memo released Thursday morning by John Detterick, the executive director of the General Assembly Council."

Neither of these two employees made the remarks that sparked the controversy, nor endorsed the comments.

The San Francisco Theological Seminary issued a statement saying the seminary group that met with Hezbollah on June 1, 2004, did so without knowing that such a meeting would occur and that the students and leaders felt uncomfortable in the presence of a Hezbollah representative and reporters from Mideast media. The Layman Online reported that the Rev. Nuhad Tomeh led another PCUSA delegation in a meeting with Hezbollah. Rev. Nuhad Tomeh's "work as the associate general secretary of Middle East Conference of Churches in Beirut is profiled on a PC(USA) Web page. Tomeh is also the regional liaison for the PC(USA) for Syria, Lebanon, Iraq and the [Persian] Gulf."

== See also ==
- Presbyterian Church (USA) disinvestment from Israel controversy
