= Presbyterian Church (USA) disinvestment from Israel controversy =

The General Assembly of the Presbyterian Church (U.S.A.) adopted a policy of "phased, selective divestment" from certain American corporations operating in Israel beginning in 2004, as a means of influencing the government of Israel. This policy has been controversial both within and outside of the denomination, even resulting in charges of antisemitism. The policy was changed in 2006 by another vote of the General Assembly.

== Divestment ==
The church stated in 1971 (UPCUSA) and 1976 (PCUS) that it has a responsibility to ensure that its funds (such as the Pension Trust for Retired Church Workers) be invested responsibly and consistent with the church's mission. The reunited church formed the Committee for Mission Responsibility Through Investing (MRTI) in 1986. The MRTI Committee carried out the General Assembly's wish to engage in shareholder activism and as a last resort, divest itself of companies which contravened the GA's position. Divestment follows a phased process that starts with attempted dialog and shareholder resolutions and ultimately the total sale of and future ban on the church's holdings in a company. The church did so with companies cooperating with the apartheid regime in South Africa. As of 2007, the PC(USA) has divested itself from nineteen companies involved in military-related production (large contractors, manufacturers of anti-personnel landmines and weapons of mass destruction), tobacco companies, and companies engaged in or supporting governments in human rights violations. In the latter category, the church most recently divested itself from Talisman Energy, which was accused of collaboration with the Sudanese government. After Talisman withdrew from Sudan, the General Assembly voted to remove it from the divestment list.

== Early communications with Israel ==
In March 2002, General Assembly Clerk Clifton Kilpatrick sent a letter to Israeli prime minister Ariel Sharon stating in part, "While we do not condone the acts of violence by certain Palestinian extremists, we are appalled that Israel, in response, has continued to punish the entire Palestinian population and its leaders who have been your government's partners in the peace process."

== 2004 General Assembly resolution ==
In June 2004, the PC(USA) General Assembly met in Richmond, Virginia, and adopted by a vote of 431–62 a resolution that called on the church's committee on Mission Responsibility Through Investment "to initiate a process of phased, selective divestment in multinational corporations operating in Israel". The resolution expressed the church's support of the Geneva Accord, said that "the occupation ... has proven to be at the root of evil acts committed against innocent people on both sides of the conflict", "the security of Israel and the Israeli people is inexorably dependent on making peace with their Palestinian neighbors", "horrific acts of violence and deadly attacks on innocent people, whether carried out by Palestinian suicide bombers or by the Israeli military, are abhorrent and inexcusable by all measures, and are a dead-end alternative to a negotiated settlement", that the United States government needed to be "honest, even-handed broker for peace", supported the idea of a United Nations peacekeeping force to ensure security in Palestinian territory, and urged "the U.S. government, the government of Israel, and the Palestinian leadership to move swiftly, and with resolve, to recognize that the only way out of this chronic and vicious impasse is to abandon all approaches that exacerbate further strife, lay aside arrogant political posturing, and get on with forging negotiated compromises that open a path to peace". A second resolution passed "Calling for an End to the Construction of a Wall by the State of Israel". The resolution opposed the construction of the Israeli West Bank barrier, regardless of its location, and opposed the United States government making monetary contribution to the construction. In separate votes, the General Assembly also adopted policies rejecting Christian Zionism as being incompatible with Presbyterian theology on the grounds of it being an offshoot of "premillennial dispensationalism".

== Criticism of resolution ==
Together, the resolutions caused dissent within the church and some friction with the Jewish community. Leaders of several American Jewish groups communicated to the church their concerns about the use of economic leverages that apply specifically to companies operating in Israel. Other critics of the divestment policy accused church leaders of antisemitism.

== Companies named for divestment ==
In 2005, the Committee on Mission Responsibility Through Investment named five companies for initial focus and that it would engage in "progressive engagement" with the companies' management. The five companies, all based in the United States, were the following: Caterpillar Inc., Citigroup, ITT Industries, Motorola and United Technologies.

== General Assembly Council response to criticism ==
In response, the PC(USA) General Assembly Council claimed that the PCUSA has "approved numerous resolutions on Israel and Palestine, repeatedly affirming, clearly and unequivocally, Israelis right to exist within permanent, recognized, and 'secure' borders". The PC(USA) was not founded until 1983, but its predecessor denominations, the UPCUSA ("Northern" church) and PCUS ("Southern" church) made several official statements on the issue. The Northern church recognized Israel's right to exist occurred in 1974. Both the PCUS and UPCUSA expressed their official support of the two-state solution in 1978 in response to the Sadat/Begin/Carter negotiations. Since then, the General Assembly of the reunited PC(USA) reaffirmed its support of a two-state solution in 1983, 1984, 1986, 1987, 1988, 1990, 1992, 1995, 1998, 2000, 2001, 2002, and 2003. Of concern to some were calls by the PC(USA) for the Israeli government "to address justly the issue of the right of return for Palestinian refugees", which is a controversial issue. Resolutions endorsing a Palestinian right of return also passed the PC(USA) General Assembly in 2003 and 2004. A former Moderator of the General Assembly, Dr. Fahed Abu-Akel, has long endorsed a Palestinian "right of return".

== Change of policy in 2006 ==
In June 2006, the Presbyterian Church (USA) 217th General Assembly overwhelmingly (483–28) replaced language adopted in 2004 that focused on the "phased, selective divestment" specifically on companies working in Israel. The new language clarified that the church should pursue its aims through the customary engagement process of its Committee on Mission Responsibility Through Investment, which can include divestment but only as a last resort. The new resolution required the consideration of "practical realities", a "commitment to positive outcomes", and an awareness of the potential impact of strategies on "both the Israeli and Palestinian economies". The 2006 resolution also recognized Israel's right to build a security barrier along its pre-1967 boundaries. The General Assembly acknowledged the "hurt and misunderstanding among many members of the Jewish community and within our Presbyterian communion" that resulted from the 2004 resolution and stated that the Assembly was "grieved by the pain that this has caused, accept responsibility for the flaws in our process, and ask for a new season of mutual understanding and dialogue".

== Reaction to change in policies ==
After the 2006 Presbyterian Church (USA) General Assembly in Birmingham, advocacy groups on differing sides of the Israel-Palestine issue praised the resolution. Groups supporting the Israelis, who had written General Assembly commissioners to express their concerns about a corporate engagement/divestment strategy focused on Israel, praised the new resolution, saying that it reflected the church stepping back from a policy that singled out companies working in Israel. Groups supporting the Palestinians said that the church maintained the opportunity to engage and potentially divest from companies that support the Israeli occupation, because such support would be considered inappropriate according to the customary MRTI process.

=== Vigilance against anti-Jewish ideas and bias ===
In May 2008, the Interfaith Office of the PC(USA) issued a statement titled Vigilance against anti-Jewish ideas and bias. This document stated that "Once again, many Presbyterians have become aware that strains of an old anti-Jewish tradition are present in the way we ourselves sometimes speak and in the rhetoric and ideas of some writers that we may read regarding" the Israeli-Palestinian conflict. The statement reports that examples of "anti-Jewish theology can unfortunately be found in connection with PC(USA) General Assembly overtures".

In June 2008 the church revised the document extensively. This resulted in a rebuke from the major Jewish denominations in a June 13, 2008 letter to the head of the PCUSA and a similar condemnation in the form of a statement from the denominations and ten other organizations.

== See also ==
- Disinvestment from Israel
- Academic boycotts of Israel
- Presbyterian Church (USA) Hezbollah controversy
- Presbyterian Peace Fellowship
- World Council of Churches#Criticism
