= Mitri Raheb =

Palestinian Lutheran theologian

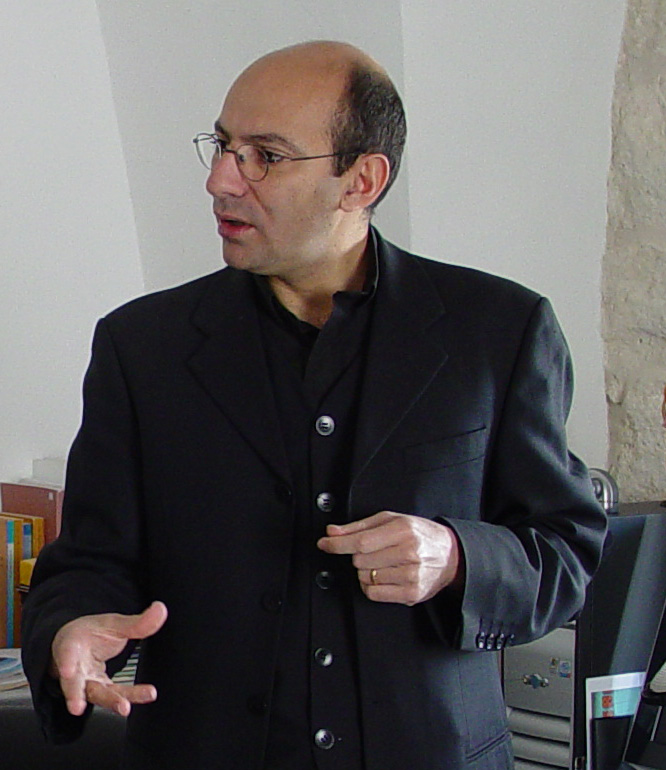
- Born: 26 June 1962 (age 64); Bethlehem, Palestine
- Occupations: President, Diyar Consortium; Pastor, Christmas Lutheran Church

Mitri Raheb (Arabic: متري الراهب; born 26 June 1962) is a Palestinian Christian, the pastor of the Evangelical Lutheran Christmas Church in Bethlehem (a member church of the Evangelical Lutheran Church in Jordan and the Holy Land, or ELCJHL), and the founder and president of the Diyar Consortium, a group of Lutheran-based, ecumenically-oriented institutions serving the Bethlehem area.

== Background ==
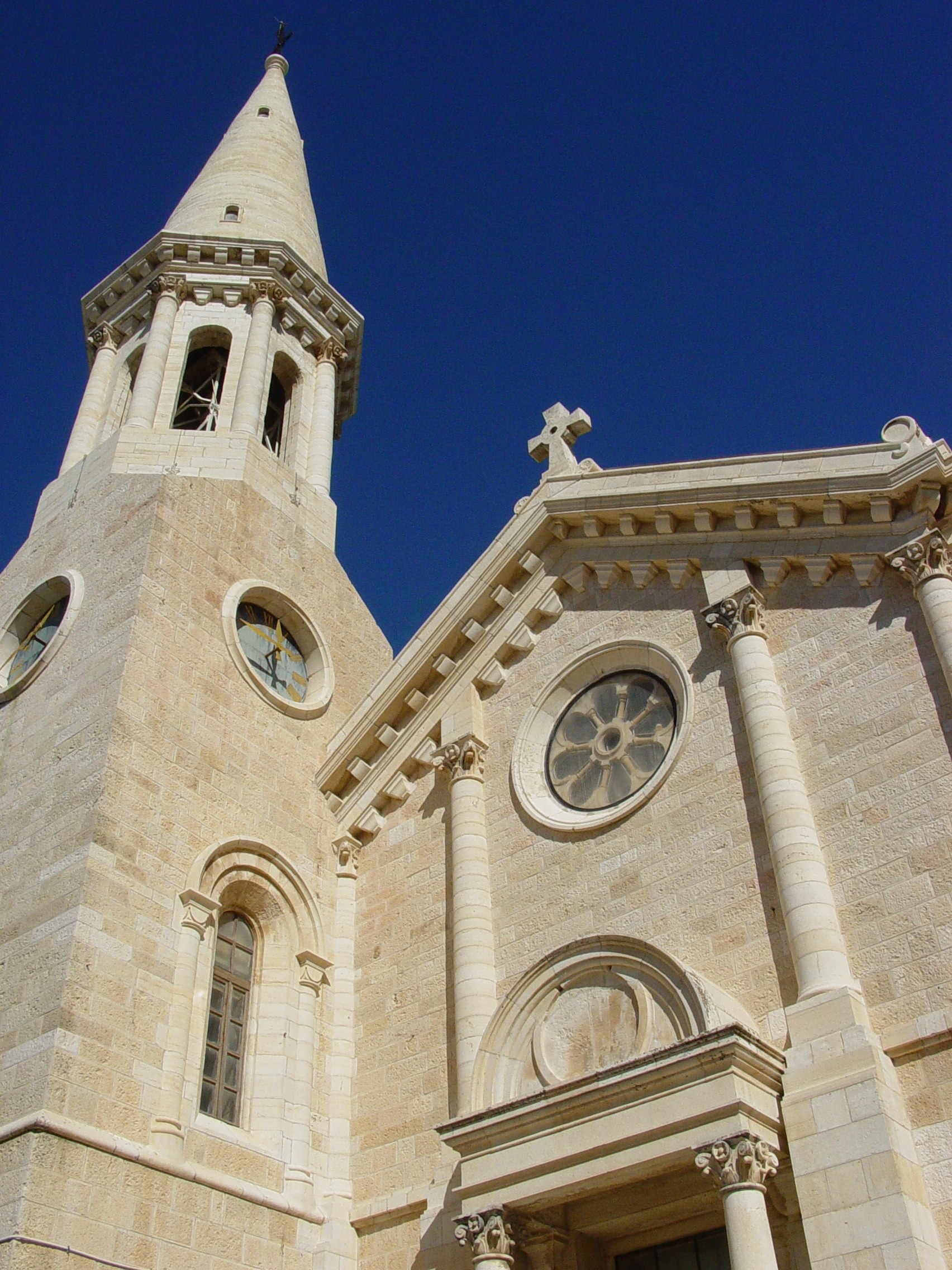
Christmas Lutheran Church in Bethlehem

Raheb was born in Bethlehem in 1962. He pursued higher education in Germany, first at Hermannsburg Mission Seminary (1980–1984) and then at Philipps University in Marburg, Germany (1984–1988), where he completed graduate studies, including a doctorate in theology. He returned to Bethlehem in 1988 to serve as the pastor of the Evangelical Lutheran Christmas Church (Christmas Lutheran Church) and as the managing editor of the Al-Liqa’ Journal for religious and heritage studies in the Holy Land (1992–1996).

Since 1992, Raheb has founded and led a number of projects and institutions serving the social needs of Palestinians living in the Bethlehem area, focusing specifically on women, children, youth, and older adults.

With the Catholic patriarch Michel Sabah, the Anglican priest Naim Ateek, activist Rifat Kassis, and others, Rehab coauthored the Kairos Palestine document. Israeli diplomats have criticized Raheb's work on the document, claiming that it is "an extremist and racist document which does not contribute to reconciliation and peace between the Palestinians and Israelis." Raheb has been critical of Western support for Christians of the region and their lack of support against the Israeli occupation: "There is talk as if the West is genuinely interested in Christians, but most of the time they only use them for their own political ends."

In 2010, at the "Christ at the Checkpoint" conference in Bethlehem, Raheb stated that "Israel represents Rome of the [Christian] Bible, not the people of the land. ... I'm sure if we do a DNA test between David, who was a Bethlemite, and Jesus, born in Bethlehem, and Mitri, born just across the street from where Jesus was born; I'm sure the DNA will show that there is a trace. While, if you put King David, Jesus and [Bibi] Netanyahu, you will get nothing, because Netanyahu comes from an East European tribe who converted to Judaism in the Middle Ages." Tricia Miller, an affiliate of CAMERA, denounced this as a "racial theory to support his belief that Jews are not the true people of the Land of Israel," adding that "the idea that Jews of European descent are not really Jewish is an old anti-Semitic fabrication used to delegitimize the connection between modern Jews, their Israelite ancestors, and their historic ties to the Land of Israel."

He currently lives in Bethlehem with his wife and two daughters.

=== The Diyar Consortium ===
The Diyar Consortium is an umbrella organization that is responsible for the administration of its component institutions: the International Center of Bethlehem, the Dar Al-Kalima Health & Wellness Center, and the Dar Al-Kalima College. "Diyar" (ديار) is the plural of "dar" (دار), meaning "house" or "homeland" in Arabic. It is headed by Raheb. The consortium is governed by a board of directors composed of diverse religious and vocational backgrounds and administered by an executive committee and three program committees (for health, culture, and education).

=== The International Center of Bethlehem (Dar Annadwa Addawliyya) ===
The ICB, or Dar Annadwa Addawliyya (دار الندوة الدولية, 'The House of the International Symposium'), is located in Madbasseh Square in central Bethlehem, about half a mile (0.8 kilometers) from Manger Square.

A number of initiatives operate under the aegis of the ICB, including:

- The Ad-Dar Cultural and Conference Center
- The Al-Kahf Gallery and Arts & Crafts Center (independently, and in cooperation with the Dar Al-Kalima College)
- The Bethlehem Media Center (independently, and in conjunction with the Dar Al-Kalima College)
- The Bright Stars Program (in cooperation with the Dar Al-Kalima Model School)
- The Abu Gubran Guest House and the Authentic Tourism Program
- The Il'Iliyeh Restaurant and Al-Kuz Bar & Café
- The Ajyal ("Generations"; أجيال) community care program for older adults
- The Azwaj ("Couples"; أزواج) group for young couples and families
- The Palestinian Christians: Strengthening Identity, Activating Potential project (headed by Rifat Kassis)

The ICB complex comprises the old Lutheran School building, the former church offices, and three other buildings. The Ad-Dar Cultural and Conference Center and other modern parts of the building were designed by Finnish architect Juha Leiviskä. The ICB complex sustained significant damage when it was occupied for 3 days by the Israeli army during the siege of Bethlehem in April 2002. Reconstruction and restoration costs totaled more than US$500,000.

=== The Dar Al-Kalima Model School ===
The Dar Al-Kalima Model School (مدرسة دار الكلمة النموذجية, 'The House of the Word') is located on the hilltop Mount Murair campus and serves students in grades K–12. The school is coeducational and Lutheran-based, serving both Christian and Muslim students from the towns, villages, and refugee camps of the Bethlehem area. The extra-curricular program after school offers students the opportunity to receive instruction in their specific, chosen areas of interest from professionals in those fields. The Bright Stars program (run through the ICB) is similar to the ECP program, but it meets once a week and is open to children who attend schools other than Dar Al-Kalima.

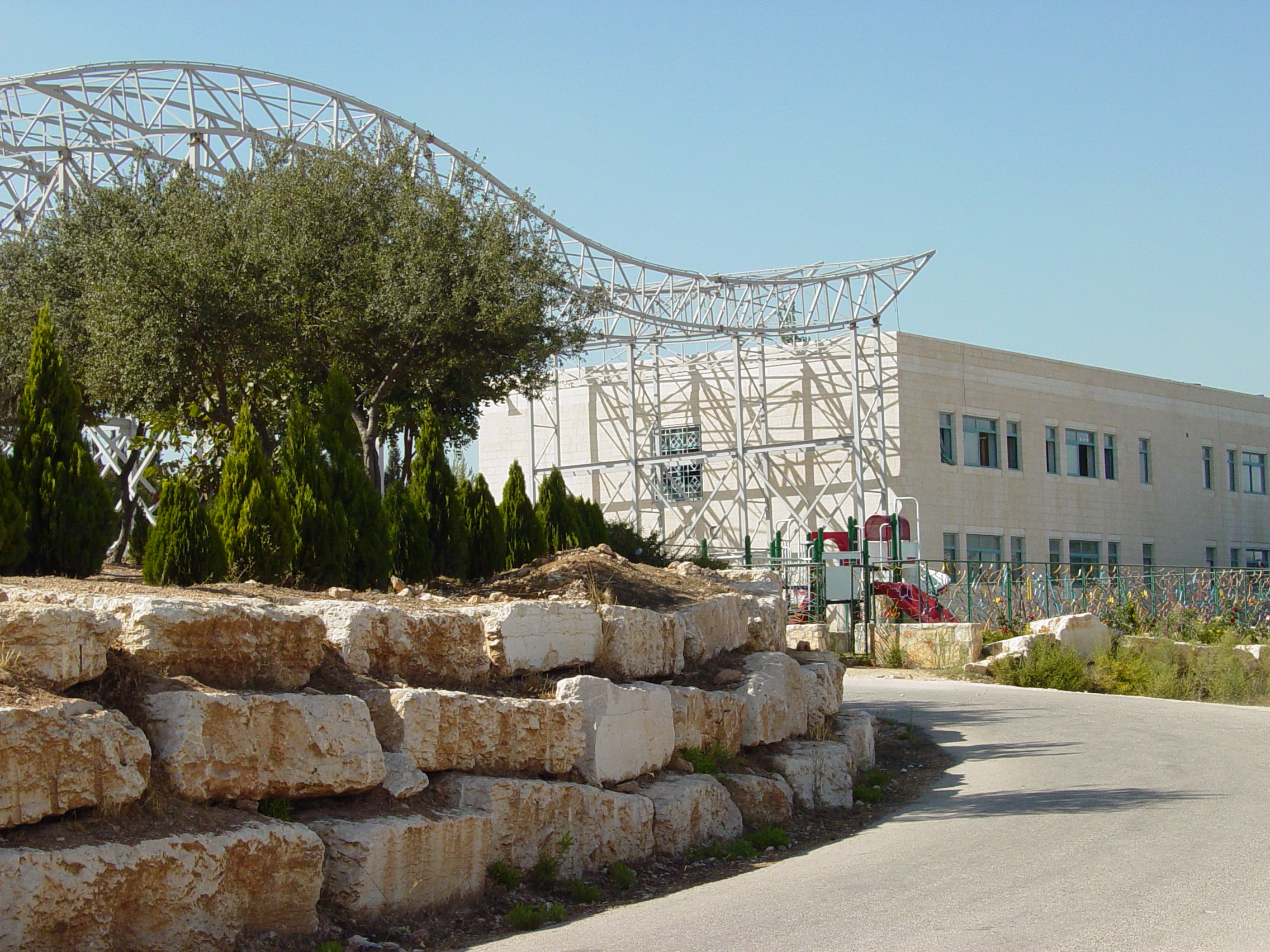
The Dar al-Kalima Complex

=== The Dar Al-Kalima Health & Wellness Center ===
The Health & Wellness Center is also located on the hilltop Mt. Murair campus, on the ground level of the building that houses the Dar Al-Kalima Model School. It houses health clinics (audiology, nutrition, endocrinology, cardiology, and psychotherapy) as well as fitness facilities and programming, including a swimming pool and sauna, yoga and aerobics classes, and exercise machines. The aims of the Health & Wellness Center are prevention through promotion of healthy lifestyles, and providing specialist care not available elsewhere in the southern West Bank.

=== The Dar Al-Kalima College ===
The College began operating in 2006 from the ICB complex in Madbasseh Square, offering diploma courses in documentary film-making and glass and ceramic art. The College received accreditation in 2007 from the Palestinian Ministry of Education and Higher Education for Bachelor’s degree programs in contemporary fine art, multimedia and tourism studies.

== Publications ==
Raheb has written 16 books and numerous articles on issues relating to interfaith dialogue, social transformation, contextual theology, and culture, many of them available in over 10 languages, including Korean, Japanese, Chinese, Swedish, Finnish, Danish, Norwegian, English, German, and Arabic.

- Mitri Raheb, The Invention of History: A Century of Interplay between Theology and Politics in Palestine, (Bethlehem: Diyar Publishing, 2011).
- Id., Sailing through Troubled Waters: Christians in the Middle East (Bethlehem: Diyar Publishsing, 2013).
- Id., Qass Collings, Rifat Odeh, Palestinian Christians: Facts, Figures and Trends, (Bethlehem: Diyar Publisher 2008).
- Id., God’s Reign and People’s Rule, (Berlin: Aphorisma 2007).
- Id., Bethlehem hinter Mauern, (Guetersloh: Guetersloher Verlaghouse 2005).
- Id., Bethlehem Besieged, (Minneapolis: Augsburg Fortress 2004).
- Id.; Fred Strickert, Bethlehem 2000 - Past and Present, (Heidelberg: Palmyra Verlag 1998).
- id.; Fred Strickert, Bethlehem 2000 – Mehr als Stern und Stall, (Heidelberg: Palmyra Verlag 1998).
- id.; Fred Strickert and Garo Nalbandian, Bethlehem: A World Heritage (Bethlehem, Diyar Publishing, 2013).
- Id., I am a Palestinian Christian, (Minneapolis: Augsburg Fortress 1995).
- Id., Ulrike Bechman (ed.), Verwurzelt im Heiligen Land, (Hamburg: Knecht Verlag 1995).
- Id., Ich bin Christ und Palaestinenser. Israel, seine Nachbarn und die Bibel, (Guetersloh: Guetersloher Verlaghouse 1994).
- Id., Das reformatorische Erbe unter den Palaestinensern: zur Enstehung der Evangelisch-Lutherischen Kirche in Jordanien, (Guetersloh: Guetersloher Verlaghouse 1990).
- Id., et al. كريمة عبود رائدة التصوير النسوي في فلسطين، ١٨٩٣-١٩٤٠, (Bethlehem, Diyar Publishing, 2011).
- Id., الدين والدولة, (Bethlehem, Diyar Publishing, 2011)
- Id., Faith in the Face of Empire: the Bible through Palestinian eyes, (Orbis Books, 2014).

Raheb has also researched the life of the Palestinian photographer Karimeh Abbud.

== Awards ==
- 2011, Deutscher Medienpreis
- 2011, Lux Mundo Award
- 2011, Esther Award
- 2008, Aachener Friedenspreis
- 2006, Internationaler Mohammad Nafi Tschleibi
- 2004, Best Spiritual Books
- 2003, HCEF Award
- 2003, Wittenberg Award
- 2003, Honorary Doctorate

Some Jewish groups protested the granting of the 2011 Deutscher Medienpreis to Raheb, among them Rabbi Abraham Cooper of the Simon Wiesenthal Center, B’nai Brith International, and Deidre Berger, head of the Berlin office of the American Jewish Committee.

Raheb's work has been recognized by the Luther Institute in Washington, DC (Wittenberg Award, 2003), Concordia University in River Forest, IL, USA (Honorary Doctor of Letters, 2003), Spirituality and Health Magazine (50 Best Spiritual Books of 2004 for Bethlehem Besieged: Stories of Home in Times of Trouble), and the Central Islamic Archive Institute (Mohammed Nafi Tschleibi International Peace Award, 2006). In 2008, he was awarded the Aachen Peace Award.

== Press ==
Raheb’s work has attracted attention from major media networks, including the BBC, ABC News, and HBO, and has been featured in publications such as Reuters, The Economist, Newsweek, The New York Times and The Boston Globe. He has also been interviewed by the Australian Broadcasting Corporation, CNN and CBS.

== See also ==
- Palestinian Christians
