= Kairos Palestine =

Organization of Palestinian Christians

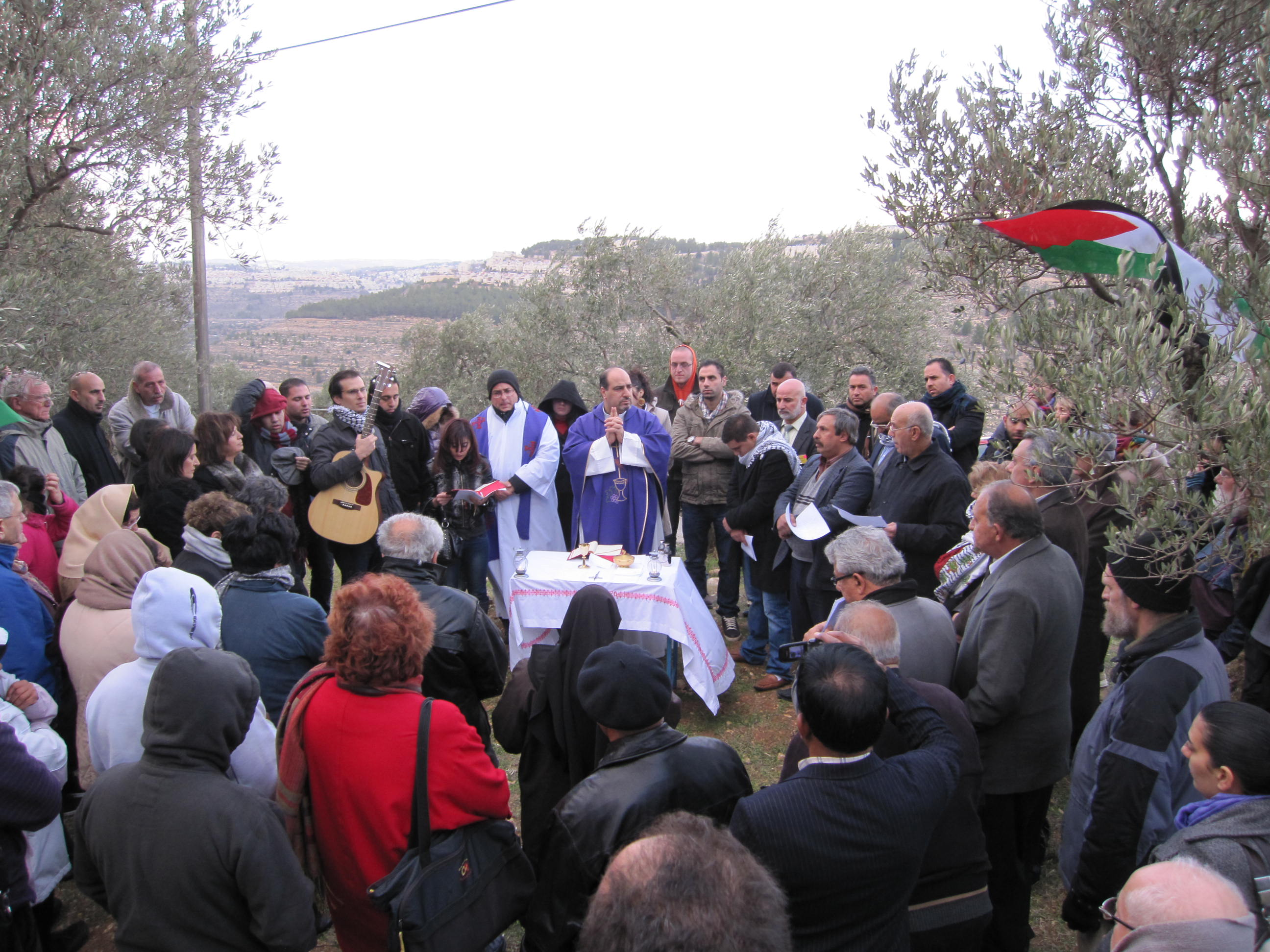
Mass in the Cremisan Valley.

Kairos Palestine is an organization primarily known for its issuance in Bethlehem in December 2009 of the Kairos Palestine document, full title of which is "A moment of truth: A word of faith, hope, and love from the heart of Palestinian suffering", a call by a number of Palestinian Christians to Christians around the world to help fight the Israeli occupation. The chief activity of the group is the promotion of this document.

Kairos is the Greek word for "an opportune or decisive moment".

The document was issued at an international conference in the International Center of Bethlehem (Dar Annadwa). Among the authors of the document were Archbishop Attalah Hanna, Rev. Mitri Raheb, Rev. Naim Ateek and father Jamal Khader. The coordinator and the spokesperson of the Kairos group is Rifat Odeh Kassis the President of the International Executive Council of Defense for Children International and the General Director of its section in Palestine. In discussing the Kairos Palestine document, the drafting of which he oversaw, Kairos Palestine coordinator Kassis explained that its production took about a year and a half because of a difference of opinions. He further said that "more than 3,000 Palestinian Christian figures have signed and adopted it." The document is available in Arabic and several European languages at the website www.kairospalestine.ps.

== The Kairos Palestine document ==
The document contains the following explanation of its objectives: "As Palestinian Christians we hope that this document will provide the turning point to focus the efforts of all peace-loving peoples in the world, especially our Christian sisters and brothers. We hope also that it will be welcomed positively and will receive strong support. ... We believe that liberation from occupation is in the interest of all peoples in the region because the problem is not just a political one, but one in which human beings are destroyed."

The document's drafters describe it as "the Christian Palestinians’ word to the world about what is happening in Palestine." They express a desire "to see the Glory of the grace of God in this land and in the sufferings of its people," and add that in this spirit they are calling on "the international community to stand by the Palestinian people who have faced oppression, displacement, suffering and clear apartheid for more than six decades." They call the document "a cry of hope, with love, prayer and faith in God," and say that it is addressed "first of all to ourselves and then to all the churches and Christians in the world, asking them to stand against injustice and apartheid, urging them to work for a just peace in our region, calling on them to revisit theologies that justify crimes perpetrated against our people and the dispossession of the land."

The document declares that the Occupation is a "sin against God" and that any theology that tolerates it cannot be Christian "because true Christian theology is a theology of love and solidarity with the oppressed, a call to justice and equality among peoples." It calls on all peoples to put pressure on Israel to put an end to its oppression and disregard for international law. It also describes non-violent resistance as a "duty" for all Palestinians, including Christians. And it charges against Israel with having launched a "cruel war" against Gaza in December 2008 and January 2009; with ravaging Palestinian land "in the name of God and in the name of force"; with separating family members, thus "making family life impossible for thousands of Palestinians, especially where one of the spouses does not have an Israeli identity card"; with restricting religious liberty for Christians and Muslims; with lack of consideration for refugees and prisoners; with turning "Jerusalem, city of reconciliation," into "a city of discrimination and exclusion, a source of struggle rather than peace"; and with holding "international law and international resolutions" in "contempt."

The document argues that an end to occupation is a precondition for an end to Palestinian resistance, not the other way around: "if there were no occupation, there would be no resistance, no fear and no insecurity." If Israelis end the occupation, "they will see a new world in which there is no fear, no threat but rather security, justice and peace." The document further rejects biblical arguments for Zionism as a perversion of "the love of God and His providence in the life of both peoples and individuals." It calls Palestinians' "connectedness to this land ... a natural right," not just "an ideological or a theological question" but "a matter of life and death." It describes "the Israeli occupation of Palestinian land" as "a sin against God and humanity" that "distorts the image of God." And it declares "that any theology, seemingly based on the Bible or on faith or on history, that legitimizes the occupation, is far from Christian teachings, because it calls for violence and holy war in the name of God Almighty, subordinating God to temporary human interests, and distorting the divine image in the human beings living under both political and theological injustice."

The document goes on to declare that "Love is the commandment of Christ our Lord to us" and that it means "seeing the face of God in every human being." Yet this "does not mean accepting evil or aggression on their part." Love, rather, "seeks to correct the evil and stop the aggression." Therefore, Christian love compels that the Israeli occupation of Palestine be resisted. While calling for "civil disobedience" and "respect of life," the document also "high esteem for all those who have given their life for our nation" and affirms the importance of citizens defending their "life, freedom and land." It endorses the BDS movement and rejects the idea of "a religious state" in the Holy Land.

== Reaction to the document ==
The document has been used in many Christian groups and denominations to encourage Christian opposition to Israel. It has never been officially adopted by the World Council of Churches. It has also drawn criticism from both Jewish and Christian groups.

In 2010, a gathering of church leaders in South Africa endorsed the document. A report on this endorsement noted that "support for Palestinians in Christian circles is gaining moral traction and theological legitimacy" and described this as "a very important trend, especially considering the fact that Christian Zionists have been among the most vocal and influential in support of the state of Israel."

The Presbyterian Church of the United States (PCUSA), in addition to endorsing the basic principles of the Kairos Palestine document, issued a study guide for its members to use while examining the full document. The study guide was prepared by the Middle East Monitoring Group. In a statement released on June 24, 2011, the Simon Wiesenthal Center (SWC) expressed its disapproval, claiming that the "study guide does not accurately portray the Kairos Palestine Document (KPD) for what it is: a revisionist document of hatred for Israel and contempt of Jews."

The Simon Wiesenthal Center (SWC) described the Kairos Palestine document as casting "a political agenda in theological garb, re-writing history, ignoring Jewish roots and presence in the Holy Land for thousands of years," and placing "all blame for the tragic circumstances of Palestinians on Israel, and none on the actions of Palestinians who blew up innocent Israelis in restaurants and launched rockets at school buses." The SWC also criticized the document for employing "the replacement theology that denied legitimacy of Judaism and Jews."

The SWC, in addition, criticized the PCUSA's study guide for failing to "instruct readers on both sides of the conflict." Instead, said Rabbi Abraham Cooper of SWC, the PCUSA's study guide "reads like an endorsement of the Kairos document by the leadership of the Church. Where the guide does offer suggestions for reading, it chooses almost exclusively from documents long criticized as hostile to Israel."

Another guide to the Kairos Palestine document was prepared by the Israel/Palestine Mission Network (IPMN), a group of activists within the PCUSA. The IPMN denounced the SWC's criticism of PCUSA's study guide, saying that the SWC's "tactics are shameless."

Abraham Foxman, the national director of the Anti-Defamation League, criticized the PCUSA on July 15, 2010, for its endorsement of the document, calling the document "a prime example of an effort to undercut the legitimacy of Israel as a Jewish State." Foxman charged the document with calling "terror a form of legal resistance," with endorsing "boycotts and divestment against Israel," and with denying "any connection between biblical covenants and the Jewish people."

Malcolm Lowe, Distinguished Senior Fellow at the Gatestone Institute and a critic of the document, has complained that while the document implicitly accuses Israelis of legitimizing their Zionism on biblical grounds, the document's authors "know ... that most Israelis do not subscribe to such a theology, but that the political theology of Hamas indeed 'calls for violence and holy war in the name of God Almighty' (or at any rate in the name of Allah)."

Lowe has also noted that the World Council of Churches (WCC) was "heavily involved in the gestation of this document as part of its long-term program to promote Palestinian political aims" and has argued that the document "is meant to mobilize churches worldwide in a program of boycotts, divestment and delegitimization directed at the State of Israel." Lowe has further suggested that the document's own reference to the 1985 South Africa document represents an implicit comparison of Israel with the South African apartheid regime.

The heads of the United Church of Christ (UCC) and the Christian Church (Disciples of Christ) praised the Kairos Palestine document as “powerful” in an April 2010 joint statement that encouraged members of both denominations to read the document, support Palestinians, and boycott Israeli West Bank products. “Palestinian Christian leadership,” said the joint church statement, “have taken the bold step of declaring this a Kairos moment, a designation not of chronological time, but of opportunity ripe for momentous action, and a moment that can be lost if the opportunity is not seized.”

The Episcopal Peace Fellowship also supported the document, although the Episcocal Church overall rejected anti-Israel divestment. Episcopal Bishop John Bryson Chane found EPF's call for divestment too “flawed and dangerously unhelpful at this particular time in history,” telling Episcopal News Service that the sanctions called for by Palestine Kairos would “further hurt the critical development of the economy of Palestine and increase the marginalization of the Palestinian people.”

In its own April 15, 2010, rebuttal to the Kairos Palestine document, the Central Conference of American Rabbis (CCAR) criticized it for arguing “that leading Israel into isolation is the only way there can be a peaceful solution in the Holy Land.” While the document professed to condemn both sides of the Israel-Palestinian struggle, it contained “pronouncements which vindicate one side while demonizing the other,” applying one “moral yardstick” to Israel and another to Palestinians, and calling for action only against Israel. Noting that the document “consistently objects to ‘the Occupation,’ without making clear that it is referring exclusively to lands occupied by Israel and in dispute since the Six-Day War of 1967,” the rabbis said that the document implicitly rejects “the very notion of a Jewish State.” The rabbis were additionally concerned that the document, while professing to reject violence, expressed “respect” and “high esteem for those who have given their life for our nation,” which they interpreted as praise of suicide bombers.

CCAR further said that the document “rejects or ignores more than a half a century of Jewish-Christian rapprochement,” seeking like previous such documents “to delegitimize the Jewish people’s continuing Covenant with God, particularly by arguing that our Covenant has been superseded by Jesus and Christianity.” Noting that “such Church documents have been utilized as pretexts for our persecution, our expulsion, and even our attempted annihilation,” CCAR said that “[s]ince the Shoah and World War II, and particularly beginning with Vatican II, the Jewish people has come to expect better from our Christian brothers and sisters. The rabbis warned that “CCAR would require serious reflection before continuing our common cause with any Church body or organization that endorses or continues to endorse Kairos.”

=== Removal of list of signatories ===
In response to a report of the inclusion of the widow of George Habash's signature on the report, the published list of signatories was removed from the Document's website.

== Controversy about prefatory statement ==
In an extensive examination of the Kairos Palestine document and prefatory statement, Malcolm Lowe rejected the claim that the document is the work of “Palestinian Christian leaders” and that it enjoys the “endorsement” of the Heads of Churches in Jerusalem. He noted that the only “Head of Church” involved in drafting the document was “Arab Lutheran Bishop Munib Younan.” Lowe also claimed that some of the Heads of Churches were actually “taken by surprise” when the document was issued, but that they were “put under political pressure to toe the line propounded by the document” and thus “issued a brief statement of their own” four days later.

Lowe argued that this text, which is now generally treated as an official prefatory statement to the document, does not in fact constitute “an endorsement of worldwide campaigns against the State of Israel” and “contains nothing that would offend people of goodwill anywhere.” Lowe suggested that the statement can even “be read as a mild rebuke to the authors of the document: Palestinian Christians should put their main effort into strengthening their own community rather than engaging in worldwide political agitation.” Lowe thus accused Kairos Palestine of deliberately misleading the public about the clerics’ involvement, combining the document and the Heads of Churches' statement into a single PDF file on the website. “The unwary reader,” complained Lowe, “does not realize that the statement is no endorsement, but rather a wary reaction that seeks to divert the energies of the faithful into constructive activity within the community rather than wasting them on vain political posturing.”

Lowe also noted that the name of Bishop Younan, the only recognized church leader on the document drafting team, was silently removed from the list of authors on the kairospalestine website. According to Lowe, Younan “asked to have it removed, so as not to be compromised by it.” Younan did not want to endanger his relationships “with Jewish religious figures and Israeli officials,” according to Lowe. “Reportedly,” Lowe added, “he now assures anyone who asks that he does not agree with everything in the document and that he is committed only to the statement of the Heads of Churches, where his name occurs near the bottom of the list.” Lowe additionally observed that Michel Sabbah, another signatory, had “retired as Latin Patriarch early in 2008, so he spoke only for himself and not for the Latin Patriarchate.”

Lowe further pointed out that in 2007 Greek Orthodox Archbishop Atallah Hanna had been suspended after publicly calling "for withdrawal of the official recognition of Greek Patriarch Theophilos III", making him not a church leader but “an opponent of the Christian leadership.” As for the other signatories of the document, Lowe argued that they were "parish priests, low level officials and laypeople", some of whom were "fairly well known as long-term agitators on behalf of Palestinian political aims." In short, the document did "not have any bona fide Christian leader among its authors."

== Related groups ==
Kairos Palestine is closely connected to the Palestinian Christian Initiative, with which it shares key members. This suggests that the two groups are intimately related, if not identical.

Rifat Kassis, the coordinator of Kairos Palestine, is also the general director of Defence for Children International – Palestine Section.

=== Kairos USA ===
Two years after the release of the Kairos Palestine document, a group called Kairos USA released an “official response” to the document called “Call to Action: U.S. Response to the Kairos Palestine Document: A word of confession and faith from the churches in the United States.” KairosUSA — The Moment of Grace and Opportunity The document argues against American aid to Israel.

Describing the original Palestinian Kairos document as “a heartfelt, sober, prayerful, urgent cry for help to end the U.S.-backed Israeli occupation,” the Kairos USA “response” began “with a confession of sin to Palestinians in the State of Israel, the West Bank, Gaza, East Jerusalem, the diaspora and in refugee camps in Gaza, the West Bank, Lebanon, Jordan and Syria.” The authors of the “response” said that “As U.S. Christians we bear responsibility for failing to say 'Enough!' when our nation's ally, the State of Israel, violates international law.” Saying that “the 'peace process' has continued to be no more than a means for the ongoing colonization of the West Bank and East Jerusalem, the imprisonment of Gaza and the continuation of the structures of oppression,” the authors also acknowledged with “deep remorse” the role of Christians in “the historic persecution of the Jewish people,” which “betrayed the teaching and example of the one we claim to follow.” The organization promised to act with greater “faithfulness, compassion and justice” in the future and pledges to “work and even suffer for peace, filled with a heart of love for both Israelis and Palestinians.” They then proceeded to describe Israel as “pursuing a course that is fruitless and corrupting, both morally and politically.” Citing the gospels of Matthew and Luke, the authors call for BDS and nonviolent direct action against Israel.

Kairos USA directly links its own document to the 1985 anti-apartheid document "Challenge to the Church", issued by Christians in South Africa.

The organization lists its objects as follows:

1. Provide a home for American Christians in their work for a just peace in Israel/Palestine, bridging the denominational, racial, and evangelical-mainline divides.
2. Call for pilgrimages to the Holy Land that witness the suffering and connect with those working for peace.
3. Disseminate the “Call to Action: a U.S. Christian response to the Palestine Kairos document.” This document will be accompanied by study materials for churches, schools and local groups and serve as a catalyst for conversation, learning, connection, and action.
4. Develop a contemporary theology of land, peoplehood and promise that will enable clergy, scholars and laypersons to better pursue open conversation, study, and positive action.
5. Connect denominations, congregations, and peace organizations here in the U.S., and link to Kairos movements across the globe.
6. Connect with congregations in Palestine and Israel, and with civil society organizations in the region working for peace and human dignity.

Kairos USA's founding document, “Call to Action: U.S. Response to the Kairos Palestine Document,” states that the organization's mission is “to mobilize the churches in the United States to respond faithfully and boldly to the situation in Israel and Palestine.” The organization calls for an end to “Israeli violations of international law and of American support for Israel.”

It is because of Christians' past sins against Palestinians and Jews, the document continues, that Kairos USA has an obligation to “work and even suffer for peace, filled with a heart of love for both Israelis and Palestinians.” It acknowledges that by opposing Israeli policy, the members of Kairos USA expose themselves “to the charge of anti-Semitism” and risk losing Jewish friends. But they are willing, they say, to take this risk in order to “follow Jesus’ path of love and forgiveness as the way to justice and peace.”

The document goes on to declare Kairos USA's support for BDS activity against Israel and for the withdrawal of U.S. support for Israel.

Kairos USA argues that “the political process has failed to bring about the changes that will result in a just and lasting peace in Israel and Palestine,” and that it is up to “the churches” to lead the peace movement.

Kairos USA urges “congregations, clergy and church leaders to become educated about the BDS movement,” insisting that “BDS is directed at Israeli policy, not the state itself or its citizens, and certainly not against the Jewish people.” Rather, it is “about promoting our own values and stated commitments by noncooperation with evil.”

In January 2016, as a result of a campaign by United Methodists Kairos Response - a group of United Methodist Church members, the Church announced it had sold its holdings in all of Israel's banks as well as an Israeli real-estate company. Israel-Palestinian Territories is on the UMC list of fourteen countries, including Eritrea, Somalia and Syria, that they believe consistently abuse Human Rights.

=== “Bethlehem Call” ===
A text entitled the “Bethlehem Call” was introduced in January 2012 as an “update” to the Kairos Palestine document. Posted at the WCC website, it defined Israel as an “illegal regime,” called for “international boycott, divestment and sanctions campaigns” against the Jewish state, defined Israel-friendly churches as “accomplices in crimes against humanity,” and rejected Christian Zionism as “a crime and sin as defying the core of the gospel.”

=== “Come and See” ===
Under the program “Come and See,” run in conjunction with tourism groups and the WCC, Kairos Palestine promotes what it calls “justice tourism,” encouraging “Christian pilgrims to live their faith as they visit the holy land, going beyond homage of ancient sites to show concern for the Palestinian people living there whose lives are severely constricted by the Israeli occupation of their lands.” Such pilgrims are invited to take “a journey of truth and transformation that will reveal the love of God to you through the eyes of the Palestinian people who, despite having suffered decades of occupation and dispossession-- maintain their dignity, faith, and capacity for hope.”

Rifat Kassis, in a January 2012 article, said that Palestine Kairos seeks “an end to unjust tourism to the Holy Land,” characterizing it as “historically monopolized by Israel and its hegemonic religious and cultural discourse...in such a way that tourism itself becomes an exclusionary political tool.”

== Conferences ==
The 2012 World Social Forum (WSF)-Free Palestine event, held in Porto Alegre, Brazil, in November and December of that year, focused considerably on the Kairos Palestine document. Kassis was present at the event, and Kairos Palestine held several presentations. Also, South African Muslim scholars issued a response document called “An Islamic Response to Kairos Palestine.” The Muslim text stated, among other things: “We reject the notion that the Eternally Transcendent and Almighty God is like a tribal chief or a dishonest realtor who parcels out land to his favorites, and we reject the idea our sacred texts can be abused as if they were title deeds of ownership.”

International Women's Peace Service (IWPS), which also took part in the World Social Forum-Free Palestine, described Kairos Palestine as “a movement addressing the injustice of the Occupation from a theological perspective.” Comparing Kairos Palestine to “liberation theology, born in the darkest night of injustice and repression in Latin America,” IWPS described the group as emphasizing “the Biblical call for justice to denounce the injustices of Zionism.”

Al-Awda co-founder Mazin Qumsiyeh represented Kairos Palestine at a Cape Town, South Africa, conference organized by Oikotree, an ecumenical group tied to the WCC. While in Cape Town, Qumsiyeh delivered a sermon at Saint George's Cathedral on March 11, 2013.

== Other activities ==
In 2012, Rifat Kassis accused right-wing Israelis of attacking Christian holy sites. “Today, they attack holy sites in the night,” Kassis said. “Tomorrow, they will attack the holy sites while they are filled with people, and then [it] will end [with them] bombarding churches and mosques while people are praying.”

Rifat Kassis criticized the Israel Defense Forces (IDF) in February 2013 for highlighting a Christian IDF officer's army service. Kassis spoke out against the conscription of Christians into the IDF and urged Christians in Israel not to allow the IDF to “use them as tools to violate the rights of the Palestinian people.”

Kairos Palestine publicly denounced Israeli Ambassador to the United States Michael Oren after he wrote a Wall Street Journal op-ed, published on March 9, 2012, implying that Palestinian Muslims were at fault for much Palestinian Christian suffering. Calling the op-ed “inaccurate and manipulative text,” the group insisted that the suffering Palestinian Christians “is caused mainly by the occupation that systematically degrades all Palestinians, restricts our movement, confiscates our land, devastates our economy, and violates our rights.” The group also insisted that Palestinian Christians “refuse to be pitted against our Palestinian Muslim neighbours and friends” and “refuse to let our collective oppression be manipulated in a way that fragments us, obscures us, or masks the oppression’s true cause.”

Rifat Kassis, in a January 2012 article, said that Kairos Palestine was “in the process of formulating a national Kairos movement, composed of young people; adults, both men and women; ecumenical and community-based organizations; and clergy.” The group was also “establishing an international “Kairos for Global Justice” movement in the wake of a Bethlehem conference at which “60 representatives from over 15 countries” decided to “mobilize churches and Christian organizations” around the world to work “for a just peace in the region.”

An April 2013 article in The Electronic Intifada described the West Bank firm SodaStream as having “looked to its Palestinian workers for help in cleaning up its tarnished image,” partly by means of a YouTube video “presenting Sodastream’s settlement factory as a happy island in the occupied West Bank.” The Electronic Intifada quoted Kairos Palestine as calling the video “cynical at best” and “at worst...criminally misleading,” and as describing the video's “emphasis on SodaStream’s economic benefits for its workers... absurd and offensive: what Palestinians need is freedom, not fancier oppression. It doesn’t matter if our cage is made of iron or gold: it is a cage.”

In 2025, a rift occurred between Kairos Palestine and the United States Conference of Catholic Bishops (USCCB), after the latter partnered with the American Jewish Committee (AJC) to publish a joint document that condemned antisemitism and anti-Zionism. The document states that calling Zionism inherently racist is antisemitic; and that allegations about Zionism being settler-colonialism, or having as its goal the ethnic cleansing of Palestinians, are antisemitic and false. Kairos Palestine condemned the document and alleged the USCCB was alienating Palestinian Christians, and doubled down after the USCCB president Archbishop Timothy Broglio responded to the criticism.

== See also ==
- Kairos Document
- Palestinian Christians
- Political theology in the Middle East
