= Rifat Odeh Kassis =

Palestinian Christian

Rifat Odeh Kassis (Arabic: رفعت عودة قسيس) is a Palestinian human rights and political and community activist. He is an author and speaker. He has been arrested and imprisoned several times by Israel.

Born in Beit Sahour to a Palestinian Christian family, he founded in 1991 the Palestinian section of the international child rights organization, Defence for Children International (DCI) and in 2005 he was elected President of the international movement. In October 2008, he was re-elected President for another term. In 2014, he concluded his work as General Director of Defense for Children International Palestine and moved temporarily to Jordan to lead the Lutheran World Federation program there.

== Career ==
In 1995 he helped to establish a rehabilitation program in Chechnya targeting Chechen children who have been injured and traumatized in the war. In 1995, he co-founded the Alternative Tourism Group (ATG), a Palestinian NGO specializing in tours and pilgrimages.

In 1996 he left Palestine to work in Central Asia for several years, helping to develop the NGO sector there.

In September 2000, he came back to Palestine to become the Executive Director of the East Jerusalem YMCA. As a response to the second Intifada he founded the "Keep Hope Alive Campaign" and founded and run the YMCA/YWCA Joint Advocacy Desk.

In 2003, he co-founded the Occupied Palestine and Syrian Golan Heights Advocacy Initiative (OPGAI), a network works on contributing to establishing a social movement and advocating on ending the Israeli occupation of Palestine and the Golan Heights. In 2005 he joined the World Council of Churches (WCC) in Geneva to run the Ecumenical Accompaniment Programme in Palestine and Israel (EAPPI). In 2008, he became a Member of the Board of Directors of Alternative Information Center (AIC).

He is a co-author and the general coordinator of Kairos Palestine which is the Christian Palestinians’ word to the world about what is happening in Palestine.

== Published works ==
He is the author of articles, study papers and researches. He spoke in national and international conferences. In 2006, he published his first book, Palestine: A Bleeding Wound in the World’s Conscience. In 2011, he published his second book, "Kairos for Palestine".

He contributed to several other published books among them:

=== In English ===
- From Communal Strife to Global Struggle- Justice for the Palestinian People. Published by AIC in 2004
- Bapylon will fall: Empire and Kingdom of God-Challenges to Christian Mission. Issued by seminaro Evangelico Teolgia, Matanzas, Cuba in 2006
- Christian Community, facts, figures, and trends. 2008, published together with Mitri Raheb, Rania Alqas and Rifat Kassis.
- A History of Child Rights in Action. Published by DCI, Geneva in 2009
- United in Struggle against Israeli Colonalization, Occupation, and Racism. Published by AIC in 2009
- Kairos for Global Justice forwarded by Patrirach Michel Sabah. Published by Kairos Palestine in 2012
- Colonial Democracy. Published by AIC in 2012
- Generation Palestine- Voices from the Boycott, Divestement and Sanctions Movement. Edited by Rich Wiles and forwarded by Archbishop Desmond Tutu. Published by Pluto Press London in 2013
- Theology of Tourism Published by the Senate of Serampore university in India in 2013

=== In Arabic ===
- Arab Spring and Christians of the Orient. Published by DIYAR in 2012

=== In Dutch ===
- Liber Amicorum- Kinderrechten Beginnen Thuis. Published by DCI/Netherlands in 2007

=== In Danish ===
- Kirker I Mellemosten-Arbog 2003-2004. Published by Det Mellemkirkelige Rad, Copenhaven in 2004

== See also ==
- Palestinian Christians
