= Gazan Christians =

Christians of the Gaza Strip, Palestine

Gazan Christians مسيحيو غزة
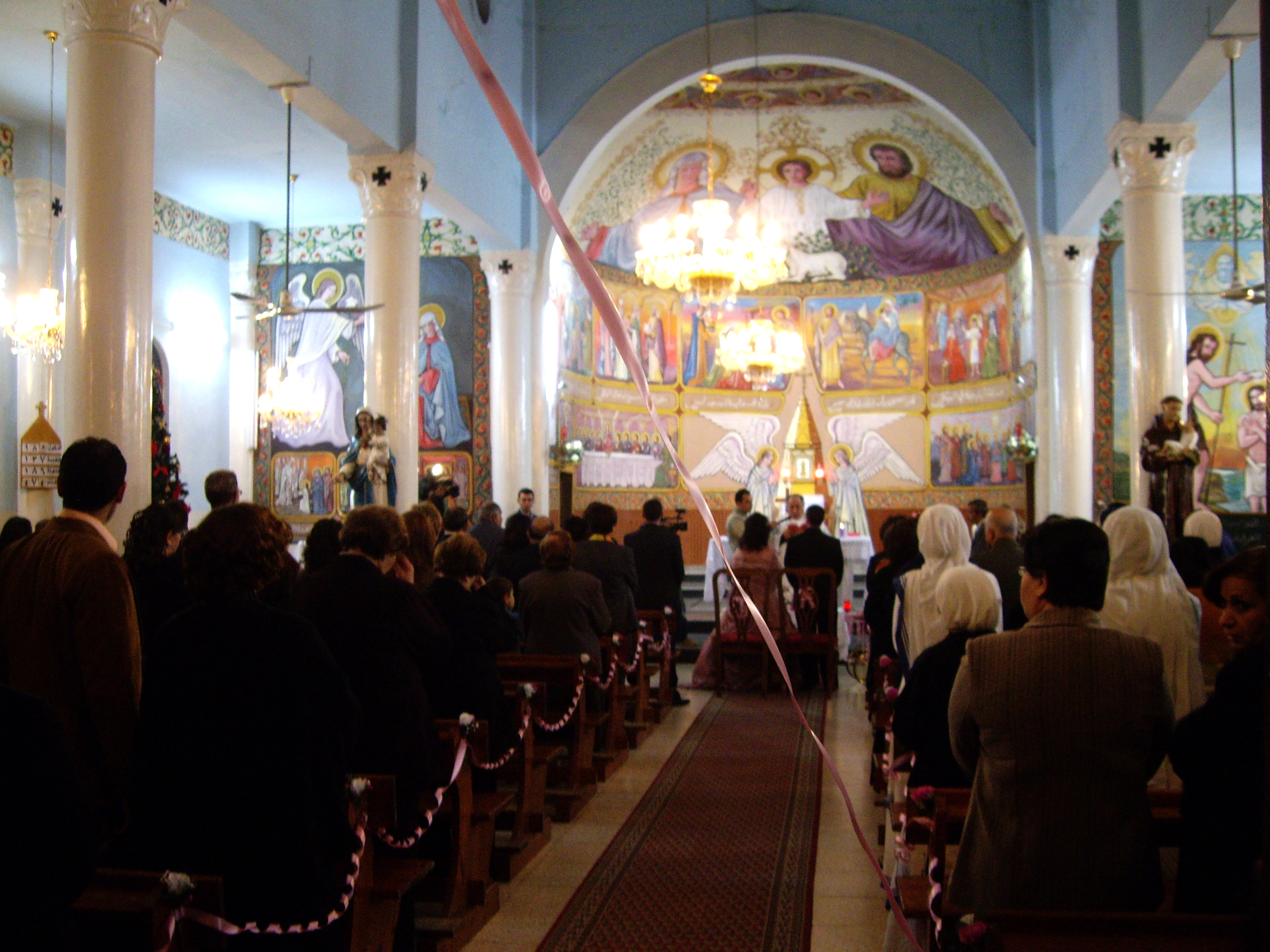
- Catholics attending Mass at the Holy Family Church in Gaza City, 2008

Total population
- ~1,000 (2025 estimate)

Languages
- Arabic (Palestinian Arabic)

Religion
- Christianity (Greek Orthodoxy • Roman Catholicism • Baptist Christianity)

Gazan Christians are Palestinian Christians from the Gaza Strip, a part of the Israeli-occupied Palestinian territories. They constitute one of the oldest Christian communities in the world.

Presently, the Gazan Christian community is concentrated in Gaza City. The majority are native inhabitants and the rest are descendants of refugees from the 1948 Palestine war. As of 2025, they reportedly number around 1,000 individuals, less than 1% of the total population of the Gaza Strip. Israeli bombing during the Gaza war (2023–present) has put the community at risk of extinction.

== Denominations ==
There are only three churches in the Gaza Strip, all in Gaza City, which minister to each of their respective branches of Christianity: Eastern Orthodox, Catholic, and Protestant.

The now-destroyed Church of Saint Porphyrius served the Greek Orthodox Gazans, who make up the majority of Christians in the Gaza Strip. The church is located in the Zeitoun neighborhood of Gaza City.

Catholics in the Gaza Strip number around 140 people, all Latin Catholics. The Holy Family Church is the only Catholic church in the territory. It is located in the Rimal neighborhood of Gaza City. In 1974, the Latin Patriarchate of Jerusalem founded the Holy Family school, which has over 1,200 students. In 2000, the Rosary Sisters founded another school (kindergarten and elementary) which has around 800 students. The schools provide education to children regardless of religion, and many local Muslims send their children to the schools.

Gaza also has a Baptist community, which is centered around the Gaza Baptist Church, founded in 1954. According to its pastor Hanna Massad, prior to the Gaza war the Gazan Baptist population amounted to only "a handful" of adherents living in Gaza City. However, during the war the number of Baptists has been reported as 60. Massad has lived in exile in Jordan since 2008, when the church was damaged by an Israeli airstrike on a Hamas target across the street. The church opened Gaza's first public Christian library in 2006.

== History ==
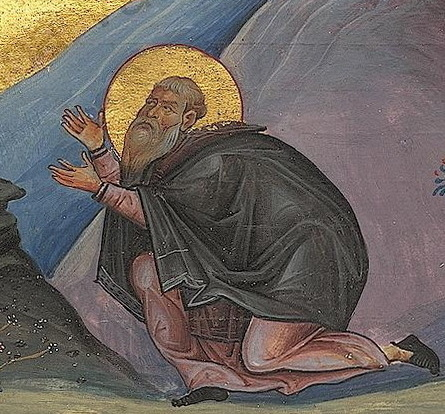
Image of Saint Hilarion, from the Menologion of Basil II (c. 1000)

=== Classical period and late antiquity ===
Christianity in Gaza originated during the Roman period. According to Dorotheus of Tyre, the first bishop of the Diocese of Gaza was a certain Philemon who was believed to have been one of the seventy disciples of Jesus and was mentioned by Paul the Apostle.

Christianity began to expand in Gaza City and the surrounding areas by the end of the third century. Saint Hilarion, considered the founder of Palestinian monasticism, was born in 291 in Tabatha (now Tell Umm el-'Amr), just south of Gaza City. An early bishop named Silvanus is said to have been killed with thirty-nine other martyrs in the copper mines of Phaeno around the year 310. At the First Council of Nicaea in 325, Gaza City was represented by its bishop Asclepas.

The inhabitants of Maioumas, the main ancient port of Gaza City, converted to Christianity en masse in 331. In 335, the emperor Constantine the Great rewarded Maioumas for its adoption of Christianity, giving it the name "Constantia" and elevating its status to an independent city with its own bishop.

Surviving 4th century writings from ancient Gazan Christian intellectuals depict biblical accounts of creation in the style of Platonic dialogues, and incorporate neo-Platonic philosophy with Christian interpretations.

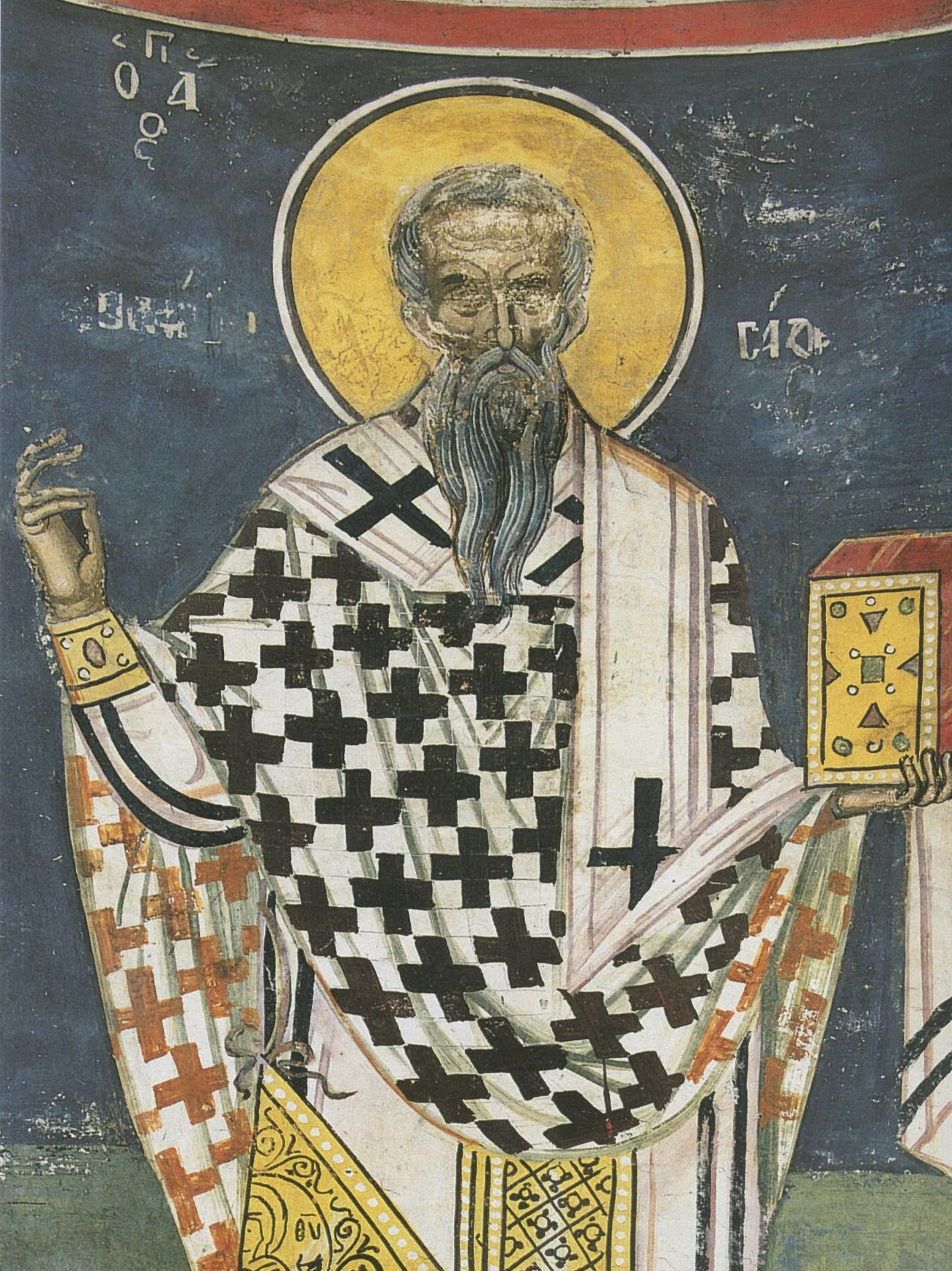
Saint Porphyrius, depicted in 16th-century fresco from Mount Athos

In the late 4th century, a conflict began between pagans and Christians in the region, which sparked the occasional intervention of Roman imperial troops. In the early 5th century, Saint Porphyrius, ordained as bishop of Gaza City, obtained the edict of the emperor Arcadius authorizing the destruction of all the pagan temples in the city.

Gazan paganism continued to remain strong, and widespread conversion to Christianity did not occur until the fifth century. When Porphyrius was ordained as bishop, the Christian population stood at less than 300 compared to the total Gazan population of 20,000 to 25,000. Adoption of Christianity during this period was driven through the efforts of Porphyrius and other holy men, and by the incorporation of indigenous ritual into church rites. In 407, Porphyrius consecrated a large central church, the Eudoxiana (named after Arcadius' deceased wife, the empress Eudoxia), in Gaza City.

Influential Byzantine historian and lawyer Sozomen originated from what is now Beit Lahia, North Gaza. The most distinguished of the Gazan Christian intelligentsia was Procopius of Gaza, who invented the catena, a form of biblical commentary. He is also known for his ekphrasis of Gaza City's mechanically complex clock. By the end of the sixth century, Christianity had been widely adopted in the Gaza region.

=== Rashidun conquest to the early modern period ===
The Rashidun Caliphate conquered Gaza City in the summer of 637, during the broader Muslim conquest of the Levant from the Eastern Roman (Byzantine) Empire. The villages surrounding Gaza City were permanently abandoned, and a "new era of demographic distribution began". Most of the region's population gradually converted from Christianity to Islam over the following centuries, but a Christian minority persisted in Gaza City up to the present day. Although alcohol was banned in Islam, the Jewish and Christian communities were allowed to maintain viticulture; grapes, a major cash crop of the city, were exported, primarily to Egypt.

Sulayman al-Ghazzi was a Gazan Christian poet and bishop during the Fatimid period (909–1171). His work provides insights into the life of Melkite Christians in Palestine during the persecutions of Caliph al-Hakim and his diwan is the earliest known collection of Arabic poetry dealing specifically with Christian religious themes.

Gazan Christians enjoyed a brief flourishing under Crusader rule in the 12th century. Following the conquest of Mamluk Palestine by the Ottoman Empire in 1517, the Christian population of Shoubak (in present-day Jordan) migrated to Gaza, making it the largest Christian center in the region.

=== Modern period ===
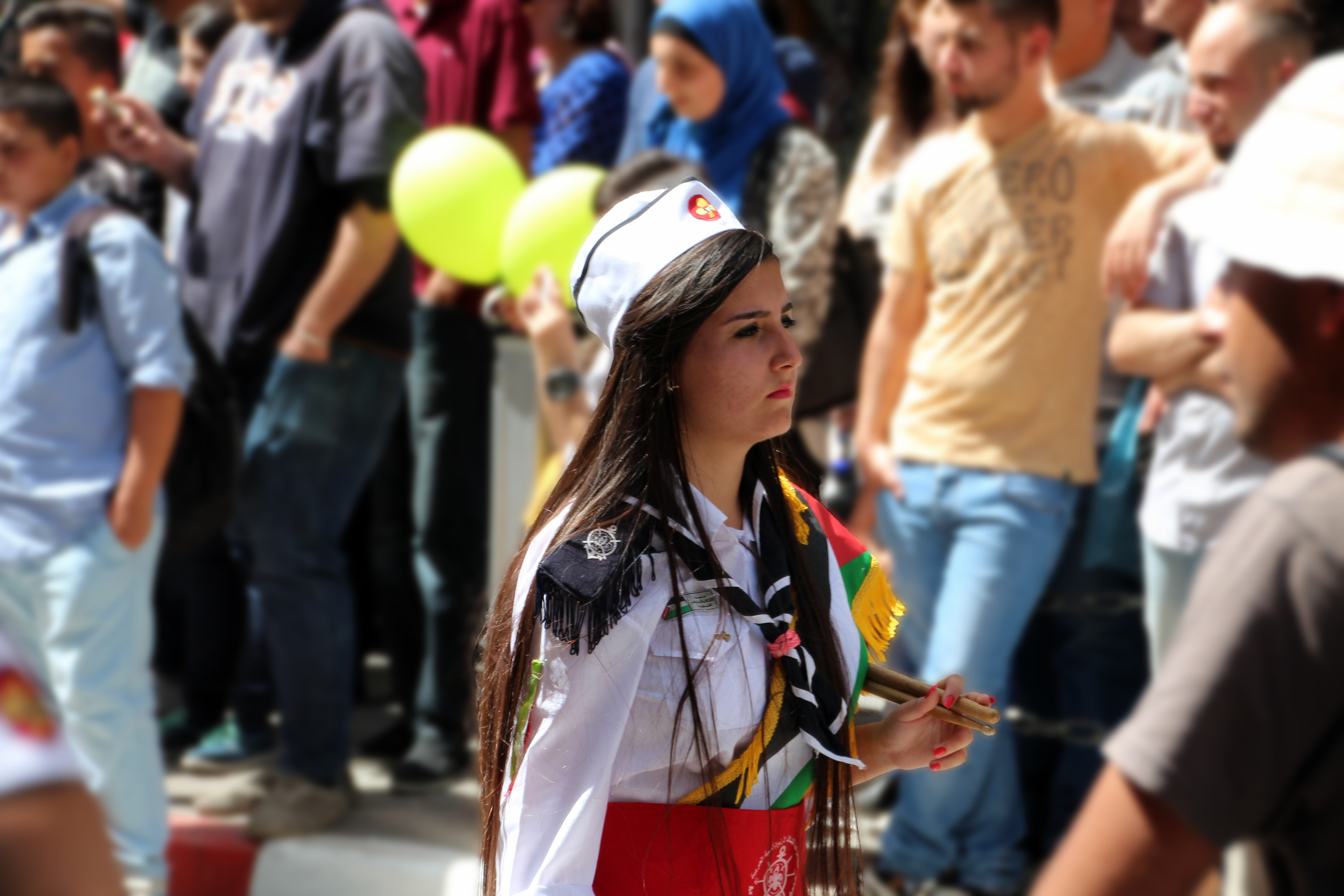
A drummer from Gaza during a Holy Saturday procession in Ramallah, 2016

At the time of the 1948 Palestine war, during which both the State of Israel and the Gaza Strip (as the All-Palestine Protectorate) were established, Gazan Christians numbered 35,000 people. The expulsion and flight of Palestinians during the war resulted in the arrival of Palestinian Christian refugees in Gaza, mostly from Ramleh. Soon afterwards, large numbers of Christians emigrated from Gaza. By the 1960s, the number of Christians in Gaza had dropped to 6,000.

Because of its height, the Gaza Baptist Church was repeatedly commandeered by Fatah and Hamas troops as an observation post during the early years of the Fatah–Hamas conflict that began in 2006. This resulted in several of the church staff being caught in the crossfire. In one instance, a church librarian was hit by gunfire during a firefight. On a similar occasion, the church bus driver, a 22-year-old newlywed, was killed. The church was raided and temporarily seized by Fatah police in February 2007.

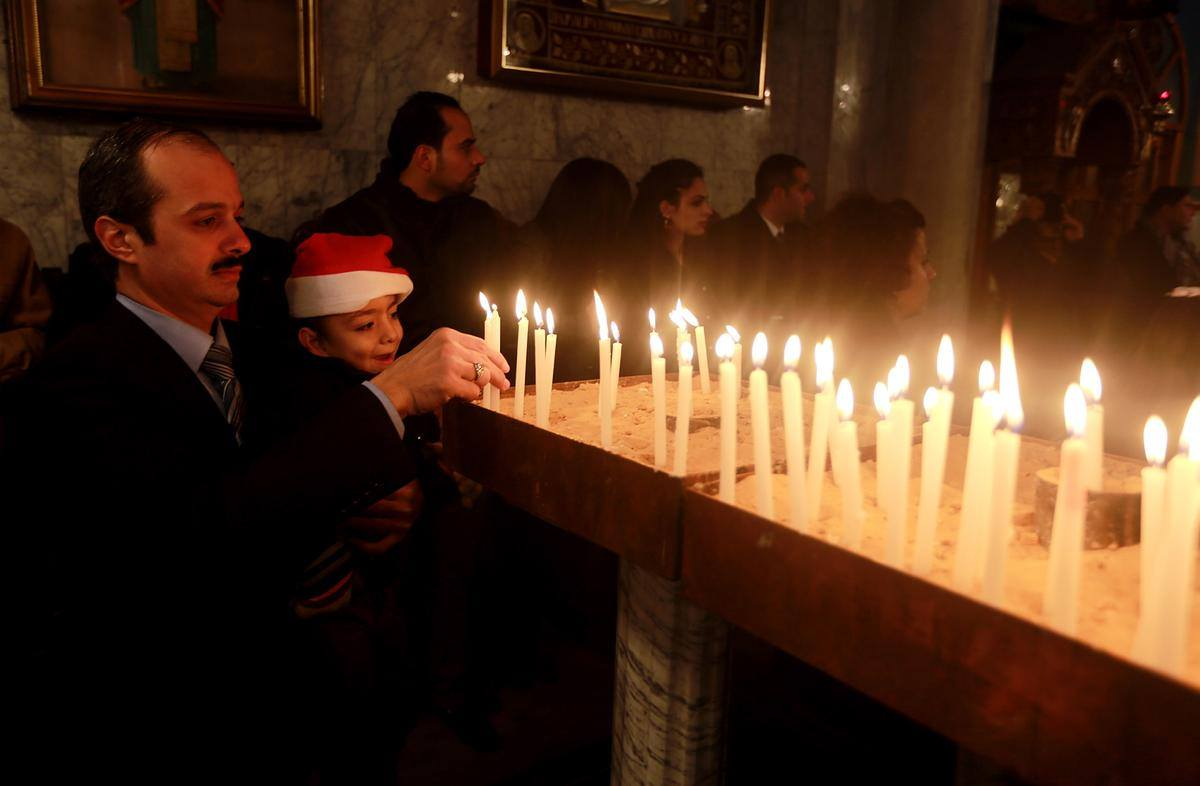
Christians in Gaza, 2021

In 2007, the year Hamas took over Gaza, the Gazan Christian population was at 3,000. Israel's subsequent blockade of the territory accelerated the emigration of Christians, with many going to the West Bank, the United States, Canada, or elsewhere in the Arab world.

The Gaza Baptist Church was damaged by an Israeli airstrike during the 2008 Gaza War. During the 2014 Gaza War, the Holy Family Church's parish school and pastor's office were partially destroyed by an Israeli airstrike aimed at a nearby house. Around 2,000 Palestinians took refuge in the Church of Saint Porphyrius during Israeli bombings. The Rosary Sisters' school was damaged by an Israeli airstrike during the 2021 Israel–Palestine crisis. In 2022, about 1,100 Christians lived in the Gaza Strip – down from over 1,300 in 2014.

All three churches in Gaza have been subjected to attacks by the Israel Defense Forces (IDF) during the 2023–present Gaza war, and around 3% of Gazan Christians have been killed by Israeli airstrikes or shootings. The Gaza Baptist Church was heavily damaged sometime in 2023. In December 2023, two Gazan Christians, Naheda Anton and her daughter Samar Anton were shot and killed at the Holy Family Church by an Israeli sniper, and the church itself was targeted by tank fire in July 2025. The Rosary Sisters' school was bombed in November 2023, and the Holy Family Catholic school was bombed in July 2024. The Church of Saint Porphyrius was bombed in October 2023 and again in July 2024. In response to Israel's August 2025 offensive in Gaza City, the Greek Orthodox Patriarchate and the Latin Patriarchate of Jerusalem announced that their clergy and nuns in Gaza would not evacuate the city and continue to care for the displaced Gazans sheltering on their properties.

The National Committee for the Administration of Gaza (NCAG), which is set to take over from the Hamas administration per the October 2025 Gaza peace plan, includes Hana Tarazi, the first female Christian sharia lawyer in Gaza; she is to be in charge of "social affairs".

== Relations with Gazan Muslims ==
=== Hamas ===
The relationship between Hamas and Gazan Christians has been subject to considerable scrutiny and debate. Some sources have described Christians in the Gaza Strip as effectively second-class citizens who face discrimination and harassment from Hamas. Other sources have described Hamas–Christian relations as usually positive, cordial, or even uneventful, probably due to the influence of Palestinian nationalism and the existence of Israel as a common enemy.

In the 2006 Palestinian legislative election, the Gazan Christian independent candidate Hosam al-Taweel, endorsed by Hamas, competed for a seat in the section of the Palestinian Legislative Council reserved for Christians, and won.

In 2009, Gazan Christians supported the Hamas crackdown on Jund Ansar Allah during the Battle of Rafah.

In 2011, some Gazan Christians interviewed by The Guardian reported an anti-Christian atmosphere in Gaza. Reportedly, people were not celebrating Christmas out of fear; young Christian men were emigrating en masse; a Hamas official had detained and threatened a Christian wearing a cross necklace; and many Christians wanted the Palestinian Authority to retake Gaza.

In 2012, tensions arose between Gazan Christians and Hamas after it was alleged that five Christians had been kidnapped by an unnamed "Islamist group" and forced to convert to Islam. The Muslim Scholars’ Association in Palestine, Hamas, and the converts themselves stated they had not been kidnapped or forcibly converted to Islam, but Gazan Christians remained skeptical, and began organizing near-daily protest rallies in Gaza City. The Palestinian Center for Human Rights met with and interviewed the converts, and concluded that they had converted out of their own free will.

In 2018, another report from The Guardian now stated that both local Christian leaders and Hamas said their relations were ones of mutual respect.

Reportedly, the Gazan Christian community refused to participate in the 2025 Gaza protests against Hamas, instead prioritizing sheltering from Israeli bombings.

=== Salafi jihadists ===
Gazan Salafi jihadist militant groups are opposed to Christianity and have attacked Christian targets. In 2007, Jaish al Mu'minun carried out the murder of Rami Ayyad, an affiliate of the Gaza Baptist Church who managed the only Christian bookstore in the Gaza Strip. Other Salafi jihadist groups that have attacked Gazan Christians include Jaysh al-Islam and Tawhid al-Jihad.

=== Gazan Muslim civilians ===
Relations between Christian and Muslim civilians in Gaza have been largely peaceful. Christians have been described as enjoying a "high level of integration" with the Sunni Muslim majority of Gaza.

Many Muslims in Gaza reportedly often celebrate Christmas alongside Christians, despite a 2020 Hamas directive that attempted to forbid this. In December 2018, a young Gazan Christian woman said that most of the attendees at her upcoming secret Santa party would be Muslim friends. In December 2022, a Christian shop owner reported that most of his customers buying Christmas decorations were Muslim.

Christian schools in Gaza play a central role in youth education, with most pupils being Muslim. Also important is the role of the Christian-run YMCA in Gaza City, which is open to both Christians and Muslims.

During the Gaza war, some internally displaced Christians ended up in the Rafah area; local Muslims agreed to allow for the burial of Christian bodies in Muslim cemeteries there due to a lack of any other options.

On the other hand, warm Christian–Muslim relations have also been characterized as the result of "strategies of association" on the Christians' behalf to ensure their survival. There have been some instances of discrimination among young students, where some Muslim children told Christian children they would go to hell. One Christian woman interviewed in late 2007 said that while Hamas has not oppressed Christians, some ordinary Muslims think that harassing Christians will please Hamas leaders.

== Relations with Israel ==
The Gaza Strip's relative isolation, due to the Israeli blockade, results in Gazan Christians facing difficulty accessing family and holy sites in Israel and the West Bank. They need travel permits for visits during Christmas. In 2021, Israel issued permits to only about half of Gaza's Christians, preventing many families from celebrating Christmas together.

Munther Isaac and Mitri Raheb, Evangelical Lutheran ministers based in the West Bank, have said that the Gazan Christian community is under threat of extinction due to Israeli bombardments. According to Raheb, it is likely that "Christianity will cease to exist in Gaza" within a generation. Rifat Kassis, general coordinator of Kairos Palestine and Global Kairos for Justice, has said that the Gazan Christian community poses a problem for Israel as their plight is able to attract attention from the West and the wider global Christian community:

Israel sees our potential to convey abroad the right picture of the situation here, which is about occupation and apartheid, not a religious conflict... We side with our Muslim brothers and sisters as Palestinians at large.

== See also ==
- Christianity in the Middle East
- Arab Christians
- Christianity in Israel
- Salafi jihadist insurgency in the Gaza Strip
- Emigration of Christians from Israel and Palestine
