= Manuel Musallam =

Palestinian Catholic priest

The Reverend Fr Manuel Musallam
- منويل مسلم
- Born: 16 April 1938 (age 88); Birzeit, Mandatory Palestine
- Education: Seminary of the Latin Patriarchate of Jerusalem, Beit Jala
- Religion: Christianity
- Church: Catholic Church
- Congregations served: Holy Family Church, Gaza (1995–2009)

Manuel Musallam (Arabic: منويل مسلم; born 16 April 1938) is a Palestinian Catholic priest who has worked in Jordan, the West Bank, and Gaza. An activist, he has strongly opposed Israel's occupation of the Palestinian territories, and the Judaization of Jerusalem. He has opened the doors of Christian schools to Muslim families, worked to achieve an understanding between Fatah and Hamas and has been instrumental in brokering solutions to both intra-Muslim and Muslim-Christian tensions.

Mahmoud Abbas, President of the Palestinian Authority, appointed Musallam head of the Department for the Christians of the Palestinian Foreign Office. He is an orator of distinction, and a founder of Palestinian Folklore Groups, for which he was awarded a gold medal. Musallem retired to Birzeit in May 2009.

Musallam supports the Palestinian right of armed resistance and has said in the past that Hamas is the sole legitimate representative of the Palestinian people. Musallam praised Hamas as a 'friend' of Gaza's Christians in 2020.

== Career ==
Musallam grew up in Bir Zeit near Ramallah. He joined the Lower Seminary in Beit Jala outside of Bethlehem to study for the priesthood in October 1951. After his ordination in 1963 he was assigned to do pastoral work in the Jordanian cities of Zarqa and Anjara during the 1960s. He earned the sobriquet of amir (prince) of the Christians among the Muslims in Zarqa while serving as assistant to Fr. Butros Aranki (1963–1968). He was appointed parish priest at Anjara in 1968 and developed solid contacts with the Palestinian fedayeen in the area. One account states that he was declared persona non grata around 1970, as the Black September Uprising broke out. After a brief period as priest of Bir Zeit parish, he was sent to Jenin (1971–1975), where there were few Christians but where his presence is still recalled with respect by the Muslims. Musallam recollects learning more about man by sitting down and drinking coffee in café bars with people in Jenin than from reading theological texts. Musallam said mass for 4 years in the Catholic compound in the heart of the Jenin, and gained some prominence as a Fatah leader, but also engaged in pastoral care for Christians in nearby villages, such as Burqin and Deir Ghazaleh.

In 1975 he was appointed parish priest to the predominantly Christian West Bank village of Zababdeh, an enclave in a predominantly Muslim area, surrounded the villages of Tefit, Jalqamus, Mughayyir and Qabatiya, where he served for 2 decades. Often he was called in to settle disputes between feuding Muslim clans in the area. Though often ordered to negotiate with the Israeli military governor, Musallam generally refused to go, though he was threatened with arrest for failure to do so, and eventually earned the governor's respect. On one occasion, hearing reports he was seriously ill, the military governor sent a helicopter to have him transported to hospital, an offer he nonetheless turned down. The respect he earned in his period in Jenin led many local Muslims to ask him to accommodate their children in Zababdeh's excellent schooling system which he oversaw on his appointment there. He readily accepted their proposal, with the result that a third of the students are Muslim youths from Jenin and the surrounding countryside.

One group of Palestinian Christians around Musallam see themselves as "the voices of the voiceless living stones in Jesus's Land", descendants of the First Christians and thus natives of Palestine, and in Musallam's view, neither converts from Judaism nor Islam, who work towards the realization of One Democratic Secular State. His rhetorical dexterity has been an important factor in forging a cross-confessional sense of shared identity among Palestinians. He was appointed to the diocese of Gaza in 1995. In Musallam's view, Palestinian Christians and Muslims are one people:the differences are annulled by the shared suffering and humiliation. Even in Gaza under Hamas administration, he notes, Muslims attend Christian weddings, baptisms and visit churches on particular occasions. Hamas, he asserts, does not fight other religions. It is engaged in a battle against the Israeli occupation.

== Oslo Accords ==
In the wake of the Declaration of Principles set forth in the 1993 Oslo Peace Accords, Yassir Arafat's Fatah organized a rally among the predominantly Muslim community to gather their support for the agreements at Jenin Refugee Camp. The opening speech, a dry analysis by the Palestinian philosopher Sari Nusseibeh received polite applause. It was followed by a passionate talk by a local shabiba (Fatah youth) promising that this was the first step towards reclaiming all of Mandatory Palestine, words that elicited a more enthusiastic response. Musallam had been chosen to close the rally, and his stirring delivery was, according to a foreign observer, interrupted after every sentence with cries of al-Ab Manuel! al-Ab Manuel (Father Manuel!). He praised the indigenous value of sumud, the steadfastness of Palestinian attachment to their homeland, from the nakba onwards through their continuing exile. With regard to Jerusalem, he preached that:

From the gate of Al-Aqsa the herald cries:
"The Crescent and the Cross are the marks on my hands!"
God is greater than the enemies
Who occupy the Dome of the Rock and crucify us.

Remodulating the words of Psalm 137:5, "If I forget thee, O Palestinian Jerusalem, let my right hand lose its cunning", he concluded his oration by stating:

They scattered us on the wind to every corner of the earth but they did not eradicate us.

The speech, delivered on 8 September 1993, was received with a seven-minute standing ovation.

== Position on Jerusalem ==
Musallam considers Jerusalem to be the patrimony of all three Abrahamic religions, and laments the decline, through emigration, of the once strong Christian population there, which has dropped from 60,000 in 1967 to 7,000 by 2006. Jerusalem is, he argues, not a legacy to be shared with Israel, or to be recognized as that country's capital. It cannot be built up as if construction there were no different from building in Tel Aviv. "Jerusalem," Musallam declares, "was the city of God, peace, and prayer but has been converted into a city of man, war and hatred. Instead of becoming the key to the doors of heaven, it has become a key to war and blood." He is convinced that Israel considers the Holy sites as "pagan" monuments, whose erasure the destroyers consider will bring them closer to God. Holy sites have been annexed and the numbers of Palestinians permitted to visit them is dwindling.

Musallam quotes Theodor Herzl, the founder of Zionism, as once declaring: "If one day we recover Jerusalem and I am still able to do anything when we do so, my first action will be to cleanse it thoroughly. I will remove everything that is not holy and burn the monuments that are centuries old."

== The Gaza Strip ==
Musallam's peace-keeping activities had won the approval of the Latin Patriarch in Jerusalem, and one of the tasks set him by Michel Sabbah when appointing Musallam Pastor at the Holy Family Church in Gaza City in 1995 was to mediate between Hamas and Fatah by working out, beyond their irreconcilable differences, the key issues on which they could agree. For the first two years, he lacked the appropriate identity papers. The mission took a personal toll: his parents accompanied him to Gaza, and died there, and the Israeli authorities denied him a permit to accompany them when they were buried in Bir Zeit. For 14 years Israel mostly denied him reentry back into the West Bank to visit family and friends, an exception being a 3 month visa conceded over 2007-8, which however coincided with Israeli obstacles placed before priests endeavouring to replace him during his absence. These included Fouad Twal whose convoy was delayed for many hours at the Erez Crossing, delays which effectively disrupted the possibility of their celebrating Christmas with the Gaza Christian community. One of Twal's cars, with gifts of chocolate, was denied transit. In Musallam's view, the Palestinians are "a nation kept in chains," and the Gaza Strip is one big prison, not a metaphor, but a reflection of the reality that, in his estimate, one half of the population has experienced detention in Israeli gaols. He regards his stay there as a 14-year detention in prison.

The Catholic parish in Gaza goes back to 1747. The Christian community there is mainly Greek Orthodox, roughly 3,000, with 200 Catholics and a handful of Baptists. ] The Catholic presence is attested by 5 Sisters of the Rosary, 3 of whom run a school that caters to 500 pupils. Overall, the 2 schools run by the Catholic church employs 80 teachers and provides co-ed education for 1,200 pupils from every denomination, including from the families of Islamic fundamentalists. Of these students, a mere 147 were from Catholic families( 2006) The Church is also present with 4 Little Sisters of the Père de Foucauld and 6 missionaries of Mother Teresa's Sisters of Charity. Musallam founded the Christian-Islamic Forum of Gaza.

In 2006, the year he was appointed monsignor, he provided in an email to a journal directed by Giulio Andreotti, a detailed description of the bleak life in Gaza. Electricity is lacking, sometimes with only 4 hours of light, and children are raised in fear of the dark, the haunt in their culture of ghosts, the devil and fear. One cannot relax together as a family or receive guests after a day's work: food is scarce, many are reduced to begging from those who have nothing and what little water is available must be drawn from wells, and drones overhead often interrupt what little television reception is possible. Salaries remain unpaid for months, children must trudge for miles to school, unable to furnish themselves with books, while missile strikes are frequent, and children are exposed to endless violence. It is not rare for teenagers to go out and commit suicide by attacking an Israeli border post, in one case, in order to relieve a boy's parents of an extra mouth to feed. The international community disdains speaking with Palestinians in their plight. To him, it looks as though the whole world looks on Palestinians as enemies. The case of Gilad Shalit, the one Israeli soldier held hostage by Hamas is spoken of as if it were a potential casus belli for world war, and yet Israel, he argues, which devastated Lebanon because Hezbollah had taken 2 IDF soldiers hostage. detains tens of thousands of Palestinians.

Pope Benedict XVI's Regensburg lecture, delivered on 12 September 2006, in which criticisms of Islam were made, had repercussions in Gaza where, as elsewhere, its diffusion gave rise to expressions of hostility from the pulpits of some mosques. Musallam managed to gain guarantees from the Mufti of Gaza, Ismail Haniyeh, Fatah and the Hamas-run Gaza branch of the Interior Minister to smooth over misunderstandings, and police guards were dispatched to watch over Christian institutions.

The following year, unknown elements attacked the Sisters of Rosary convent as the civil war between Fatah and Hamas raged in 2007. The doors were blown down by mortars, and icons were destroyed, religious books burnt, and the church ransacked. Musallam deplored it as a barbaric act by unknown people trying to seed tensions between the Islamic and Christian Communities, and both Fatah and Hamas condemned the act, with the latter undertaking to repair the damage.

From 2007 to 2014, the youth in Gaza, he noted, had endured 4 wars, which made teaching them not to hate Israel difficult. Absolute poverty destroyed the customary attendance at festive events. Water was so scarce menstruating women could not clean themselves, nor labouring fathers wash after a day's work. The children were reduced to playing war games:

The children continued to play games, as usual, but the games they kept on playing systematically, were those of war. They would divide themselves into two sides, and shot at each other...The Nassar family had 7 children who, on those occasions when they could leave their home, would organize a battle, a game below their house. In the streets, they would paint themselves red and attack anyone passing by. They were well furnished with arms, and had an intimate knowledge of the tactics of attack and defense. They picked up their wounded, created situations, and transpoerted the dying to hospital. Then they conducted funerals, in which they simulated despair for the dead.

When the length and breadth of Gaza was subject to intense Israeli airstrikes and artillery fire during Operation Cast Lead in 2008, in what Musallam terms "the Christmas War". The roof of his home was destroyed by a missile; the school run by the Sisters of the Rosary was struck by several Israeli missiles, and with phosphorus bombs. Musallam sent out a comuniqué from the smoking rubble protesting the way the people of Gaza were being "treated like animals in a zoo", suffering from malnutrition, trauma, with thousands of wounded lacking elementary first aid The basic supply of necessities required the transit of 700 trucks per diem, while only 20 were allowed through.

== Use of Biblical imagery ==
Musallam's evaluation of the Israeli-Palestinian conflict frequently draws on biblical imagery. Musallam claims that Palestinians reject Israel's existence; what human virtue can have one accept the presence of a state that is destructive and disrespectful of the right of Palestinians to life, and destroying in the process the humanity of its own people. He paraphrases the prophet Hosea (Hosea 10:12): "Sow for yourselves justice, reap the reward of loyalty". He made a negative analogy of the closure of the Gaza–Egypt border to the Flight into Egypt, where at least Joseph could ferry the Christ Child to safety and sanctuary abroad. Musallam has argued that the Lamentations of Jeremiah throw light on what is happening in the Gaza Strip,

please open your Bible and read the Lamentations of Jeremiah.This is what we are all living. People are crying, hungry, thirty and desperate.. Even if there is food for sale, people have no money to buy food. The price of food, of course, has doubled and tripled in the situation,. They have no income, no opportunities to get food from outside and no opportunities to secure money inside Gaza. No work. No livelihood. No future. They have no hope and many very poor people are aimlessly wandering around trying to beg for something from others who also have nothing. It is heart-breaking to see.

He likened the effects of the Israeli assault in Operation Protective Edge on Gaza in 2014 to those of an "atomic bomb", and regards the silence of the world as unforgivable.

== Notable remarks ==
- For war an instant is enough. Peace is like a child that first must be conceived in its mother's womb, in the heart of a nation, then it must be born into the world and watched every moment, otherwise it dies.
- Occupation is a sin and a form of terrorism, and when relying on the texts of the Torah to kill people or expel and remove them from their land it rises to the level of a crime against humanity.
- "May Christ's compassion revive our love for God even though it is currently in 'intensive care'."

== Works ==
- (with Jean-Claude Petit) Curé à Gaza: Un Juste en Palestine, (Parish priest in Gaza: A just man in Palestine) L'Aube 2010
- (with Nandino Capovilla) Un parroco all'inferno: Abuna Manuel tra le macerie di Gaza (A parish priest in hell: Abuna Manuel amid Gaza's rubble) Editioni Paoline 2009.

== Sources ==
- Al-Jamal, Muhammed (21 August 2013). "Christians In Gaza: History and Struggle". The Holy Land Christian Ecumenical Foundation.
- Capovilla, Nandino (2009). Un parroco all'inferno. Abuna Musallam tra le macerie di Gaza (in Italian) (2nd ed.). Paoline Editoriale Libri. ISBN 978-88-315-3734-6.
- Chorherr, Christa (2008). Wessen Heiliges Land?: Christen im Israel-Palästina-Konflikt [Whose Holy Land? Christians in the Israel-Palestine conflict.] (in German). Braumüller. ISBN 978-3-7003-1643-5.
- "Clerics Denounce Jewish Rabbi's Attack against Christians, Muslims". Wafa. 4 January 2016.
- "Curriculum vitae". Latin Patriarchate of Jerusalem. 21 April 2015. Archived from the original on 4 June 2018.
- Droeber, Julia (2013). The Dynamics of Coexistence in the Middle East: Negotiatingh Boundaries Between Christians, Jews, Muslims and Samaritans. I. B. Tauris. ISBN 978-0-85772-298-0.
- Filiu, Jean-Pierre (2014). Gaza: A History. Oxford University Press. ISBN 978-0-19-020191-3.
- "For Gaza parish priest, Israel's offensive on the Palestinians was like an "atomic bomb"". AsiaNews. 14 August 2014.
- "For Gaza priest, Israel's occupation humiliates the Palestinian people". AsiaNews. 15 June 2010.
- "Gaza priest slams barbaric attack against Sisters of the Rosary". AsiaNews. 19 June 2007.
- "Latin Patriarch urges Fatah, Hamas to lay down arms; in Gaza, annual parade and midnight mass are canceled". Haaretz. 24 December 2006. Archived from the original on 9 September 2010.
- Littlewood, Stuart (31 March 2010). "Palestine's 'Turbulent Priest' Delivers Blistering Easter Message". The Palestine Chronicle.
- Musallam, Manuel (2006). Cubeddu, Giovanni (ed.). "Chronicles from prison". 30 Days. No. 9.
- Musallam, Manuel (2008). Cubeddu, Giovanni (ed.). "The Christmas war". 30 Days. No. 12.
- Omer, Mohammed (January–February 2008). "Gaza's Christian Community—Serenity, Solidarity and Soulfulness". Washington Report on Middle East Affairs. pp. 16–17.
- "Palestinian Christians: The Struggle for Survival". Catholic Culture. 27 December 2001.
- Parry, Robin (2010). Lamentations. Wm. B. Eerdmans Publishing. ISBN 978-0-8028-2714-2.
- Sabella, Bernard (2011). "The Status of Non- Muslims in a Palestinian State". In Ahlstrand, Kajsa; Gunner, Göran (eds.). Non-Muslims in Muslim Majority Societies: With Focus on the Middle East and Pakistan. The Lutterworth Press. pp. 73–91. ISBN 978-0-7188-4301-4.
- Weaver, Alain Epp (2014). "The Crescent and the Cross are the Marks on My Hands". In Rowe, Paul S; Dyck, John H.A.; Zimmermann, Jens (eds.). Christians and the Middle East Conflict. Routledge. pp. 137–151. ISBN 978-1-317-80111-5.
- Weaver, Alain Epp (March–April 2015). "Response: Longing for the Land Within the Land". Syndicate: A New Forum for Theology. 2 (2): 27–36. ISBN 978-1-4982-2516-8.
- White, Patrick (1992). Mourning in Bethlehem: Impact of the Gulf War on Palestinian Society. Gracewing Books. ISBN 978-0-85244-174-9.
- Wistrich, Robert S. (2007). "Theodor Herzl: Between Myth and Messianism". In Gelber, Mark H. (ed.). Theodor Herzl: From Europe to Zion. Walter de Gruyter. pp. 7–21. ISBN 978-3-11-093605-6.
