= Holy Family Church, Ramallah =

Church in Ramallah, West Bank, Palestine

Holy Family Church
- كنيسة العائلة المقدسة
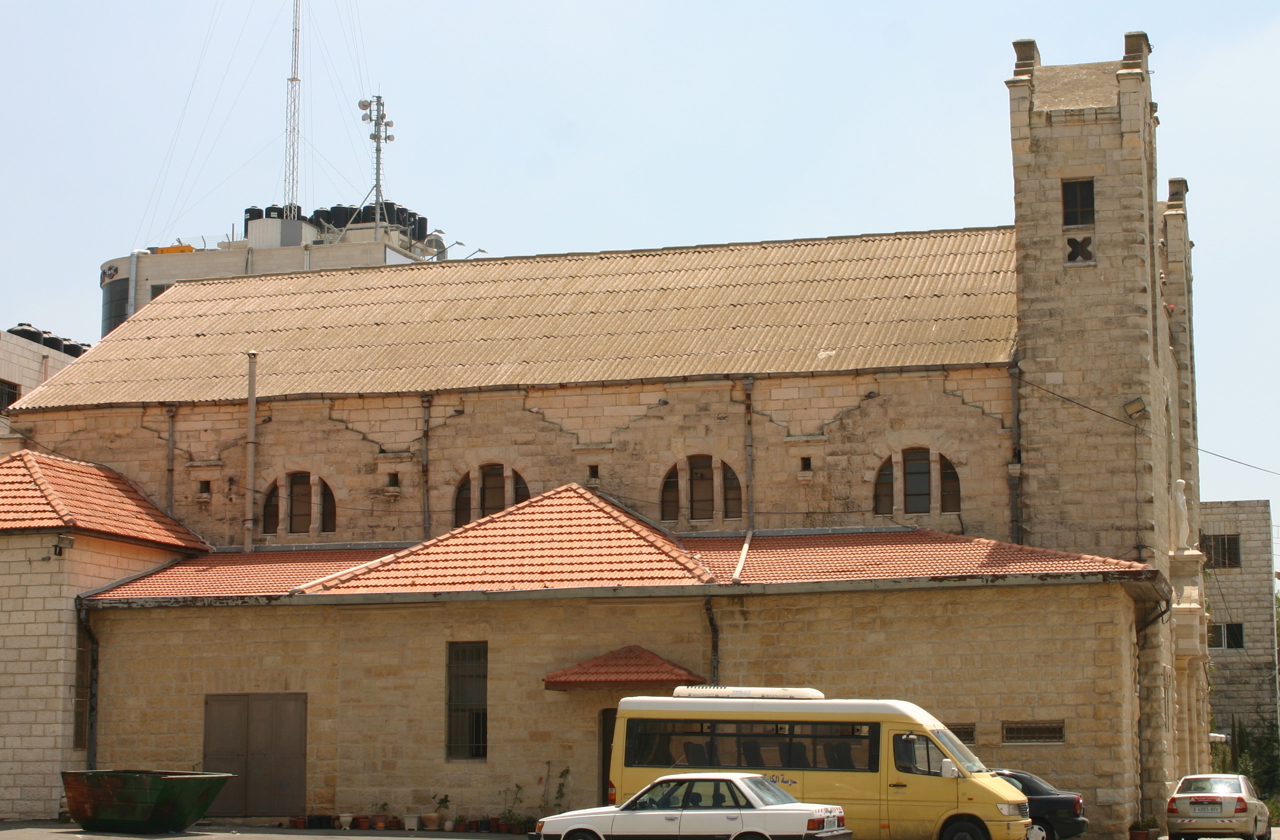
- Holy Family Church
- 31.905°N 35.1997°E
- Location: Ramallah
- Country: Palestine
- Denomination: Roman Catholic Church

The Holy Family Church (Arabic: كنيسة العائلة المقدسة) is a Catholic Church in Ramallah, West Bank, Palestine.

== History ==
In 1860-1870, Latin Catholics settled in Ramallah after the Sisters of St. Joseph and the Rosary Sisters opened schools there. Mass was celebrated in a house in the Hatha neighborhood. The Latin Patriarch, Archbishop Valerga, sought permission to build a church, but permission was granted only forty years later. In 1870 there were 150 Catholics in Ramallah and 242 in 1902.

The construction of the church began in 1913 with the permission of the Ottoman authorities. There is also a rectory, a convent and a school.

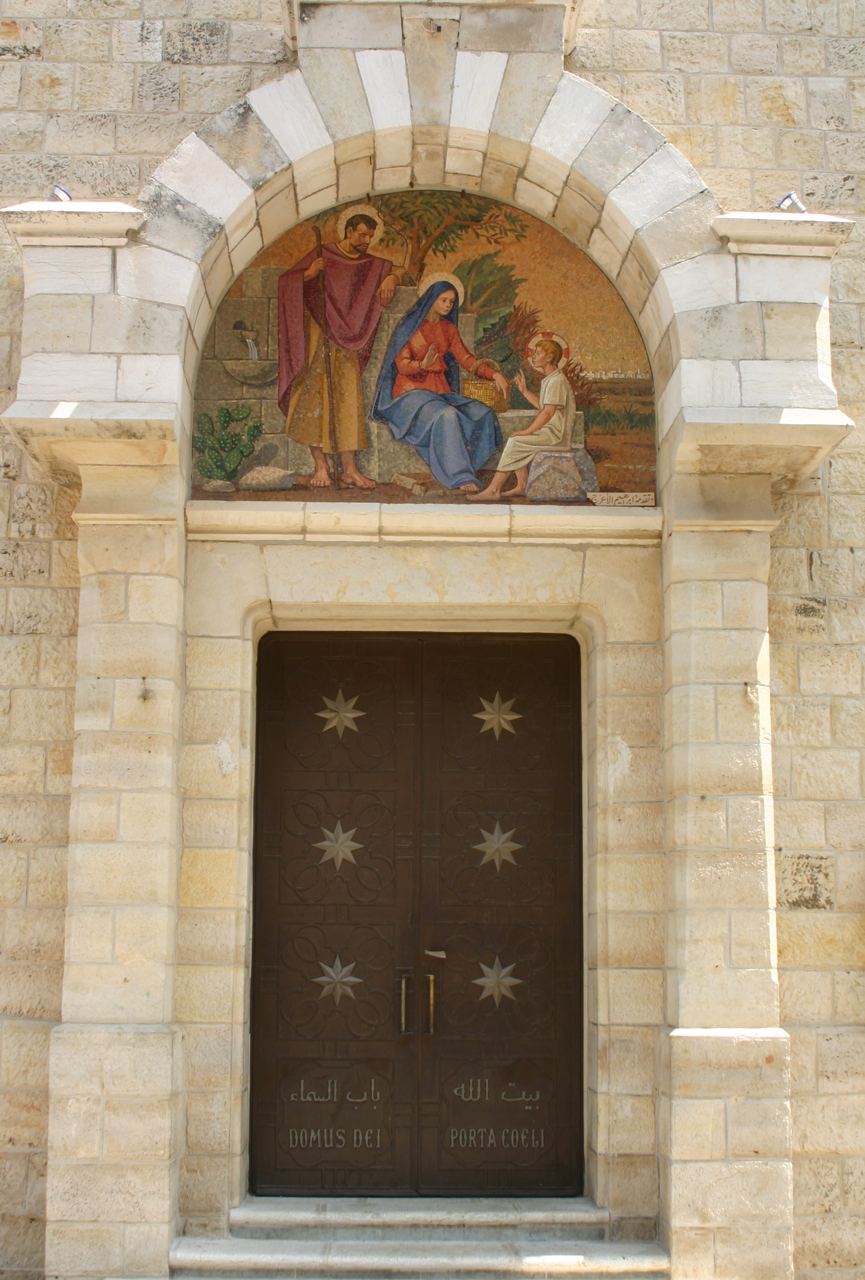
View of the entrance of the church

By 1981, the number of Catholics of Latin rite in Ramallah had risen to 1,100 parishioners.

== See also ==
- Catholic Church in Palestine
- Holy Family Church, Gaza
