= Ihab al-Ghussein =

Palestinian politician (1979–2024)

- إيهاب الغصين

Deputy Labor Minister of Palestine
- In office 2020 – 7 July 2024
- President: Mahmoud Abbas

Minister of Communications
- In office 2012–2020
- President: Mahmoud Abbas
- Prime Minister: Ismail Haniyeh

Personal details
- Born: 12 May 1979 Kuwait
- Died: 7 July 2024 (aged 45) Gaza City, Gaza Strip, Palestine
- Cause of death: Israeli airstrike
- Party: Hamas
- Children: 1 (deceased)
- Education: Islamic University of Gaza
- Occupation: Politician

Ihab al-Ghussein (Arabic: إيهاب الغصين; 12 May 1979 – 7 July 2024) was a Palestinian politician who served as the de facto spokesman of the Interior Ministry of the Palestinian Authority based in the Hamas-administered Gaza Strip.

== Biography ==
Al-Gussein was born on 12 May 1979.

In 2012, he became the director of the Communications Ministry in the Gaza Strip until 2020, when he was appointed as the Deputy Minister of Labor. He was involved in merging the Executive Force of Hamas into the Palestinian security forces which includes police, national and internal security, civil defense forces and firefighters. Al-Ghussein ordered the release of 150 prisoners who were members of Fatah and other Palestinian factions. During Israel's air strikes against Hamas government buildings in 2008–2009 Gaza War, in which Israel claimed it killed Hamas operatives launching rockets, al-Ghussein replied that those killed were "Gazans at work, not activists launching rockets as Israel."

== Death ==
On 7 July 2024, during the Gaza war, an Israeli airstrike on the Holy Family Catholic School in Gaza City killed al-Ghussein and three others, according to reports by Palestinian media. Hamas confirmed his death and said an earlier airstrike on a home killed his wife and daughter. Al-Ghussein was 45.
