= Holy Family Church, Gaza =

Only Catholic parish in Gaza, Palestine

Coordinates: 31°31′26.70060″N 34°27′7.17494″E

Holy Family Church
- كنيسة العائلة المقدسة; Kanisat Al-ayilat Al-muqadasa
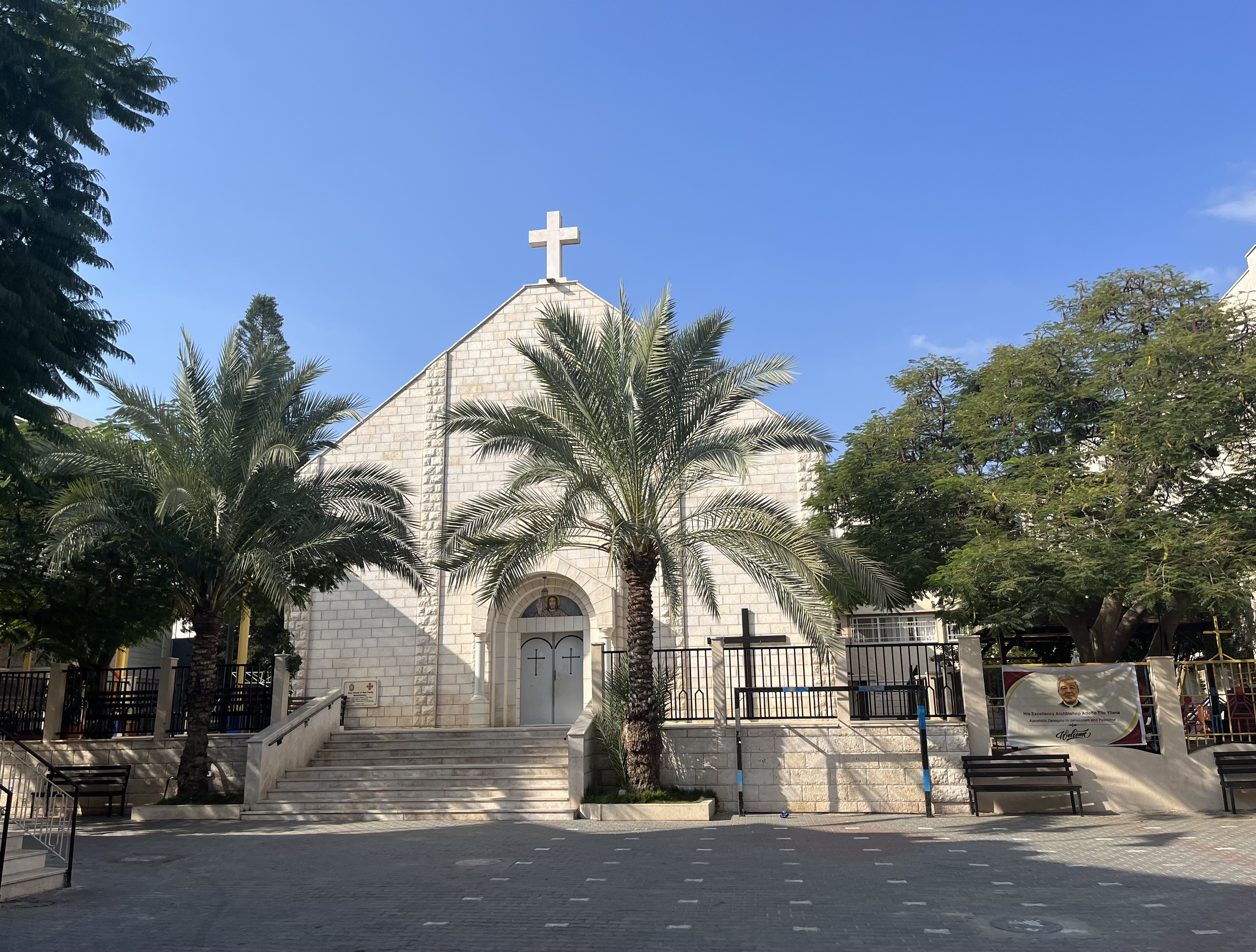
- The church exterior, in 2022
- Holy Family Church
- Location: Gaza City
- Country: Palestine
- Denomination: Catholic Church

Administration
- Archdiocese: Latin Patriarchate of Jerusalem

Clergy
- Archbishop: Pierbattista Pizzaballa
- Priest: Fr Gabriel Romanelli IVE

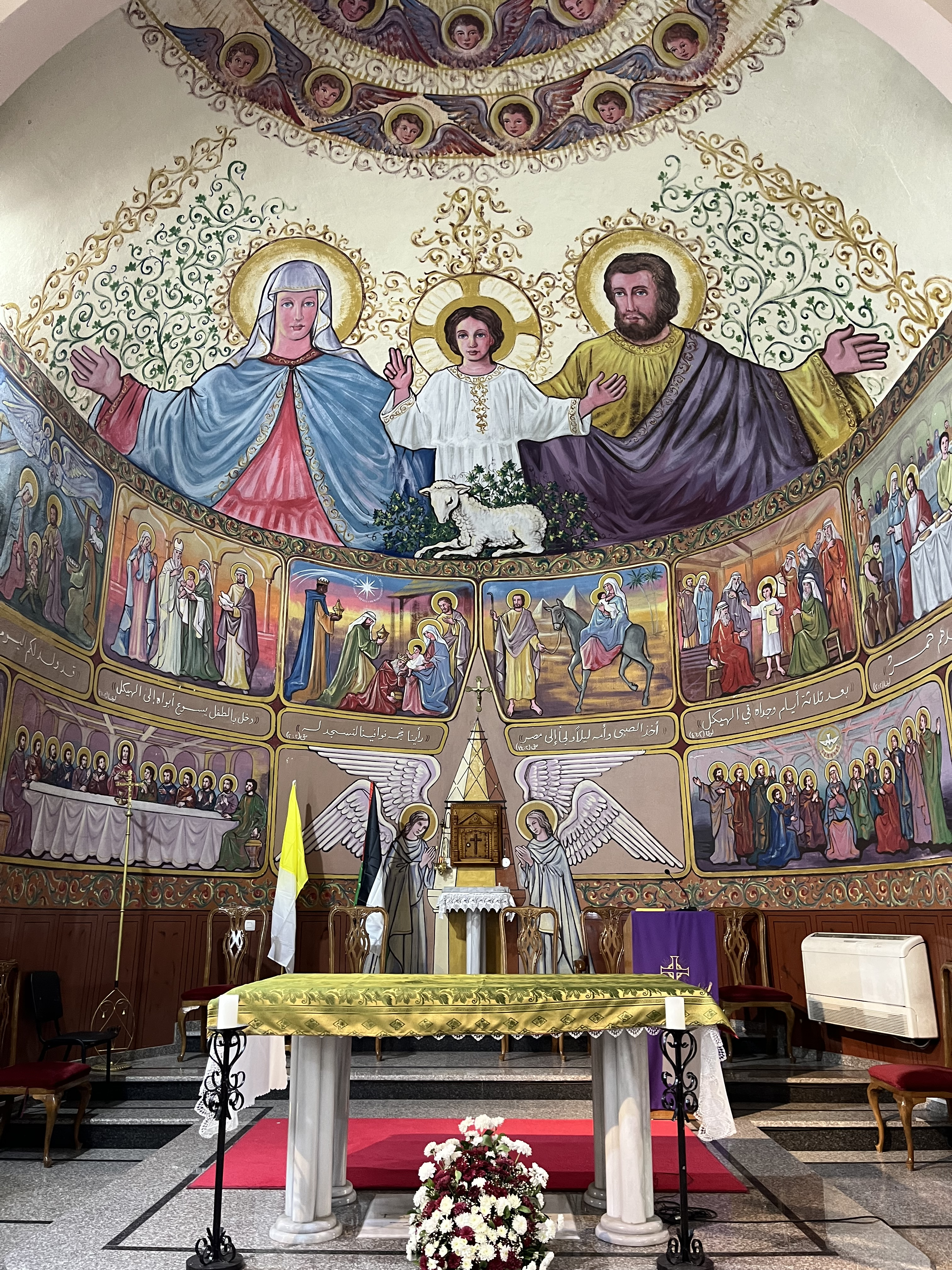
Sanctuary and altar of the church, 2022

The Holy Family Church (Arabic: كنيسة العائلة المقدسة) of Gaza City is the only Catholic church in Gaza, Palestine. Construction of the church was completed in 1965.

The parish includes a school which provides a Christian education to children in Gaza, and it works closely with the nearby religious congregations of the Missionaries of Charity, Servants of the Lord and the Virgin of Matará (SSVM, the female branch of the Religious Family of the Incarnate Word), and the Rosary Sisters. The Missionaries of Charity care for the elderly and disabled, and the Rosary Sisters operate a school. The community is served by priests from the Institute of the Incarnate Word (the male branch of the Religious Family of the Incarnate Word).

The church and its school have been attacked multiple times by the Israeli Defense Force since the 2023 outbreak of the Gaza War. The attacks have resulted in multiple deaths of Gazan Christians and damage to the church.

== History ==
The church was built in the 1960s, with construction finishing in 1965. In 1974, the Latin Patriarchate of Jerusalem founded the Holy Family School, which has over 1,200 students. In 2000, the Rosary Sisters founded another school (kindergarten and elementary) which has around 800 students. The schools provide education to children regardless of religion, and many local Muslims send their children to the schools.

From 1995 to 2009, Father Manuel Musallam, a noted Palestinian peace activist, was parish priest of the Holy Family community. In 2007, the Rosary Sisters' convent was looted and vandalized by unknown perpetrators. When asked about Muslim–Christian relations in Gaza after the attack, Fr. Musallam said that relations were excellent, and that Muslims in the community had promised to help repair the damage.

During the 2014 Gaza War, the parish school and the pastor's office were partially destroyed by an Israeli airstrike aimed at a nearby house.

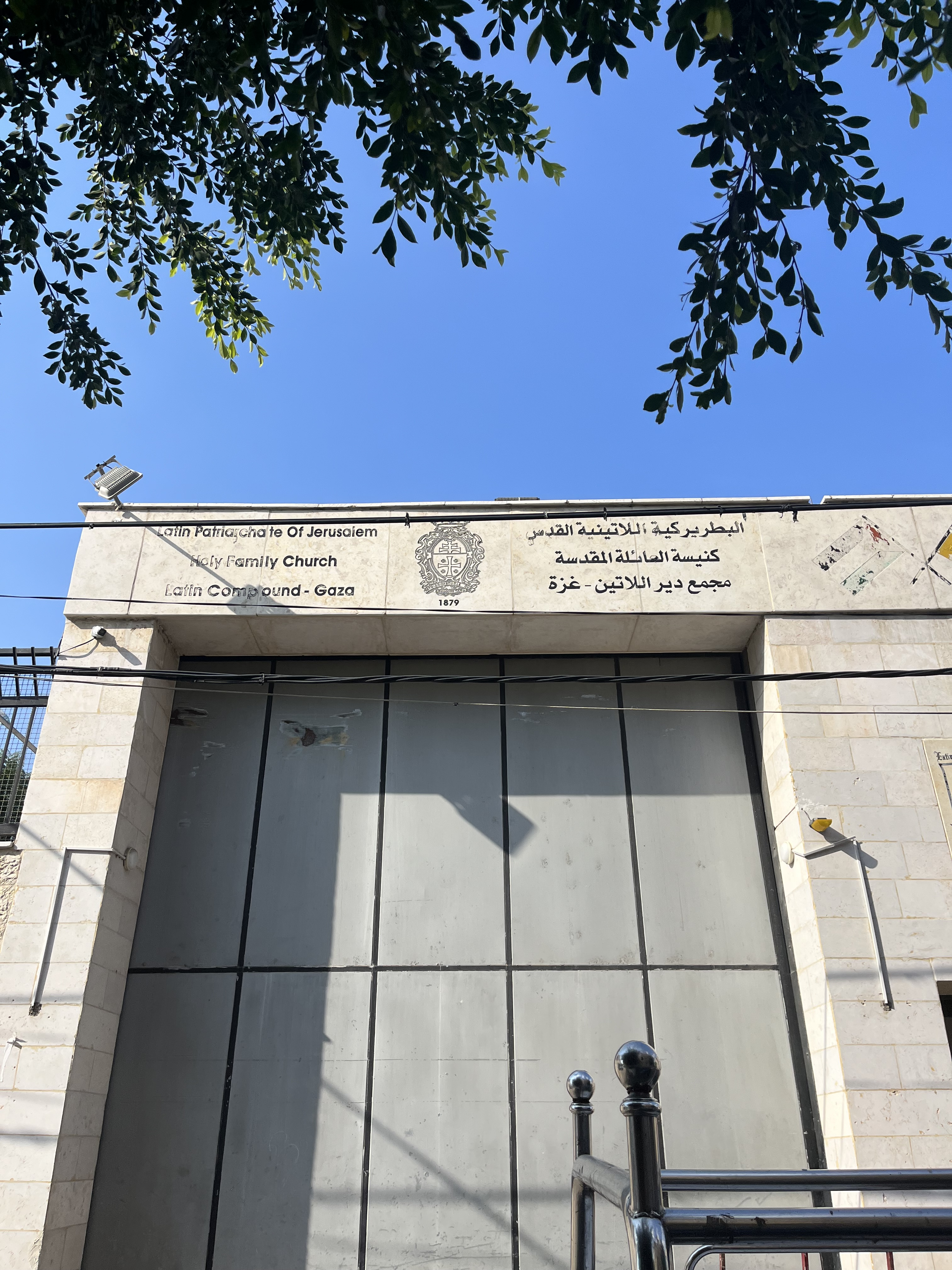
Entrance to the Holy Family compound, 2022

In 2021, the Catholic community in Gaza consisted of 133 people. The Rosary Sisters' school was damaged by an Israeli airstrike during the 2021 Israel–Palestine crisis.

=== Gaza war (2023–present) ===
During the 2023 Gaza War, the church, school, and convents have sheltered several hundred refugees, including Christian families whose homes were destroyed. On 9 October, Pope Francis called the parish priest, Gabriel Romanelli IVE, to offer prayer for the Christian community of Gaza. At the time, Romanelli was stranded in Bethlehem and unable to return to Gaza due to the war. On 16 October, Pope Francis called Yusuf Asaad IVE and Nabila Saleh SSVM, both serving at Holy Family, to offer more support for the faithful of Gaza. On 4 November, the Rosary Sisters' school was destroyed when it was targeted by an Israeli air strike. As of 1 December, Romanelli, still unable to return to Gaza, reported that 600 people were sheltering in the church. He also thanked Pope Francis and Patriarch Pizzaballa, and said that the pope had called the Holy Family parish daily. On 11 December, Aid to the Church in Need (ACN) reported that the church had been damaged by shrapnel from Israeli airstrikes, which destroyed solar panels, water tanks, and other buildings in the parish complex. ACN also reported that the parish has run out of fuel, cutting off most communication. British-Palestinian MP, Layla Moran, who has family members sheltering there, has stated, "I fear my family under siege by Israeli forces in a church in Gaza will not survive until Christmas, between the snipers and the lack of water." Media outlets have reported that around 650 Palestinian Christians have used the church as a refuge since the start of the war. A new medical centre was established near the church following earlier war damage at its previous location.

==== Killing of Naheda and Samr Anton ====
On 16 December 2023, Nahida and Samar Anton were killed by gunfire in the church compound. Pierbattista Pizzaballa, the Latin Patriarchate of Jerusalem said: "Nahida and her daughter Samar were shot and killed as they walked to the Sister’s Convent. One was killed as she tried to carry the other to safety. Seven more people were shot and wounded as they tried to protect others inside the church compound. No warning was given, no notification was provided. They were shot in cold blood inside the premises of the Parish, where there are no belligerents." Pizzaballa said the shooter was "a sniper of the IDF". The incident was widely reported and condemned by church figures including Pope Francis and the Archbishop of Westminster, Cardinal Vincent Nichols. The Israeli military said it had not targeted the church. Following an investigation, the IDF alleged that Hamas had fired an RPG from the vicinity of church, and that IDF soldiers had fired back and hit Hamas spotters. The Catholic Church has maintained no Palestinian belligerents were in the area, and the Latin Patriarchate of Jerusalem issued a fiery rebuke, stating the woman had been "intentionally targeted" and killed "in cold blood".

==== July 2024 bombing ====
On 7 July 2024, an Israeli bomb targeting Palestinian Deputy Labor Minister Ihab al-Ghussein hit the Holy Family Catholic School, killing four people sheltered there, including the official. The attack was condemned by the Latin Patriarchate of Jerusalem.

==== July 2025 strike ====
On 17 July 2025, three people were killed and ten others were injured, including the parish priest, Gabriel Romanelli, after Israeli forces targeted the church with tank fire. The attack was later condemned by the Prime Minister of Italy, Giorgia Meloni, stating that, "The attacks against the civilian population that Israel has been carrying out for months are unacceptable. No military action can justify such an attitude." Pope Leo XIV said that he was "deeply saddened to learn of the loss of life and injury caused by the military attack". The Israeli Defense Forces claim the church was mistakenly hit by stray fire, but this assertion is contested by Cardinal Pizzaballa, the Latin Patriarch of Jerusalem, with the Patriarchate condemning the attack as "targeting of civilians and of a sacred place." The American Jewish Committee subsequently directed a $25,000 donation to the church via the Roman Catholic Archdiocese of New York for repairs, while not criticising Israel for the strike and repeating its explanation for it in its donation announcement.

== See also ==
- Church of Saint Porphyrius, the Greek Orthodox church of Gaza City
- Gaza Baptist Church, the Protestant church of Gaza City
- Holy Family Church, Ramallah, Catholic church of the same name in the West Bank
- Catholic Church in Palestine
