= Killing of Nahida and Samar Anton =

2023 Israeli shooting of Palestinians

- Part of the Gaza war
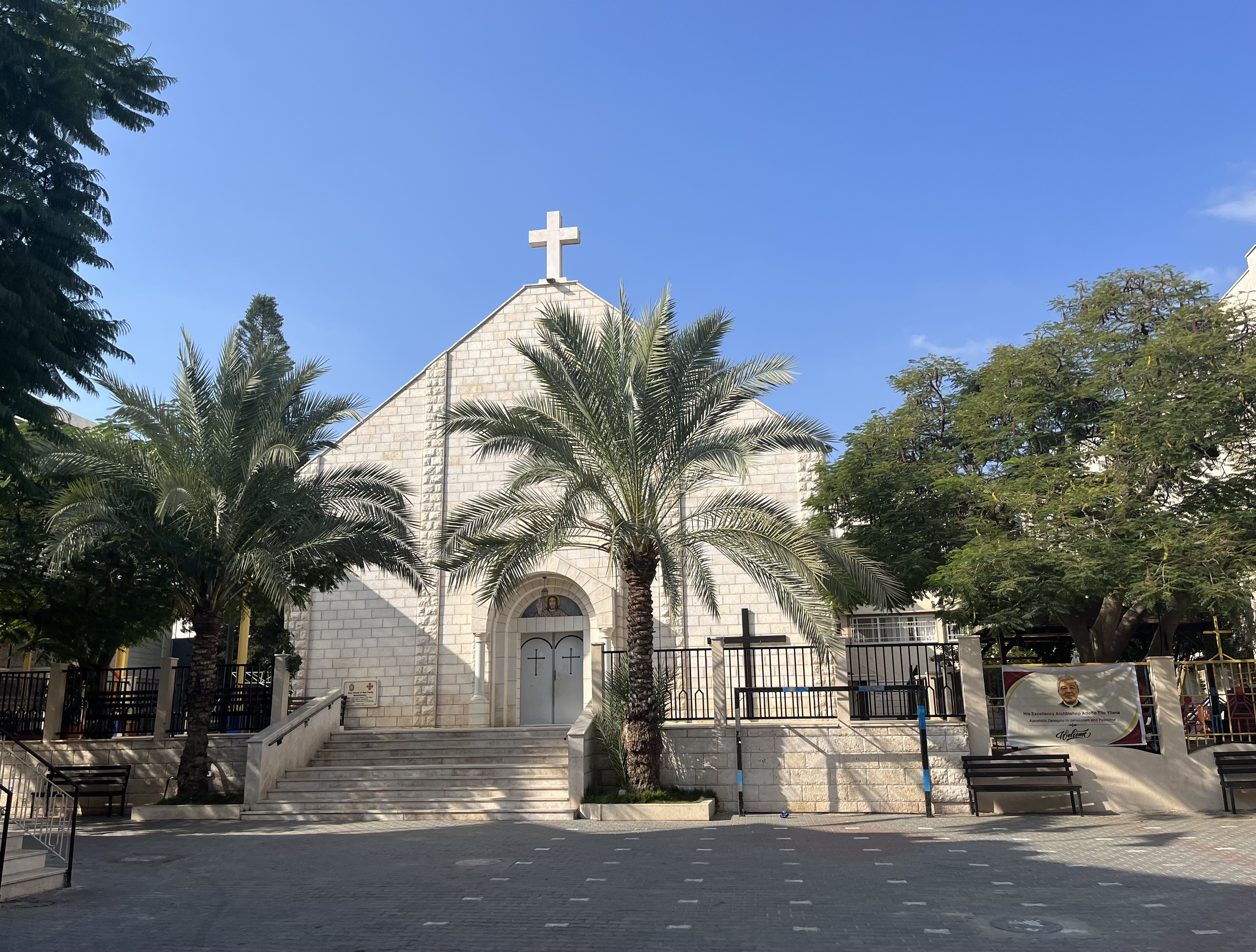
- Holy Family Church, Gaza
- Location: 31°31′26.7″N 34°27′7.18″E; Holy Family Church grounds, Gaza City, Gaza Strip, Palestine
- Date: 16 December 2023
- Target: Palestinian Christians
- Attack type: Mass shooting
- Deaths: 2
- Injuries: 7
- Perpetrator: Israel Defense Forces

On 16 December 2023, two Palestinian Christians, Nahida Khalil Anton (Arabic: ناهد خليل بولس أنطون) and her daughter Samar Kamal Anton (سمر كمال أنطون), were shot and killed while they were walking inside the grounds of the Holy Family Church to go to the bathroom during the Gaza war.

The Latin Patriarchate of Jerusalem said that the shots were fired by an Israeli sniper. The Israel Defense Forces (IDF) has repeatedly denied this.

== Background ==
=== Beginning of the war ===
At the outbreak of war, the Christian community in the Gaza Strip numbered 1017 members, of which 135 were Catholic, and together they make up barely 0.05% of the population of the Gaza Strip. (Note: "sie machen kaum 0,05 Prozent der palästinensischen Bevölkerung im Gazastreifen aus." (Hillebrand 2023)) Relations with the wider Muslim population were peaceful, with outreach programmes catering to the poor and elderly, and thousands of Muslim children studied in Christian schools. During the hostilities, the Holy Family Church in Rimal, Gaza City, became a refuge for over 300 displaced, mostly Christian, individuals, and by the time of the killings, was sheltering 648 Gazans. The church was well prepared to offer these services because experience of many prior conflicts had led it to stockpile supplies for such emergencies.

=== October–November ===
These had been replenished during the November 2023 ceasefire, though by December the community was on short rations.

After an intense exchange of emails through 14 to the 26 October between the Catholic Relief Services (CRS) and U.S. Senate staffers, the latter had informed Israeli military liaisons that the church was sheltering civilians, providing them with the exact coordinates of four buildings. The IDF responded that it could not guarantee the safety of any civilians inside, urging that the community be evacuated, something that was not feasible given the many disabled and elderly in their care. In one email, one of the four buildings, the Handicap Children's House, was identified as being a mosque by the Israeli authorities.

=== November–December ===
IDF bombings had leveled most of the buildings in the vicinity of the church. On 12 November, against the advice of her fellow Christians, one elderly (84–85) Baptist woman who had taken refuge in the church grounds, Elham Farah—a church organist, musical teacher, and reportedly, a relative of the Palestinian poet Hanna Abu-Hanna (Note: Sources state that she was Abu-Hanna's daughter. La Repubblica's account identifies her as the daughter of a noted Palestinian poetess.)—ventured out of the grounds of the compound, either to see if her home was still standing or to retrieve some personal belongings. A driver accompanied her but stopped short of her home, since it was too dangerous to proceed. She left the car and proceeded on foot, and then was shot in the leg by an Israeli sniper, and fell not far from al-Shifa Hospital, which was under siege at that time.

She lay wounded all night, calling out for help. No one in the locality—not even the ambulances—could come to her aid because of the risk of snipers. Her niece, alerted by local people, posted a call for an ambulance with her aunt's telephone number. According to eyewitnesses, her body was run over by an Israeli tank the following morning.

On 15 November, the British Liberal Democrat Member of Parliament Layla Moran stated in the House of Commons that members of her Palestinian family, including a grandmother, a cousin, his wife, and their 11-year-old twins, were sheltered in the church; according to their accounts, the compound was being hit by gunfire and white phosphorus, (Note: Layla Moran stated to The Independent: "I have been told white phosphorus was thrown into the compound, that the bin collector was shot dead as he tried to come into the compound, and that a janitor trying to fix a carpet was also shot." Bel Trew adds that "White phosphorus is an incendiary, used to create light and smokescreens during combat. Using it isn't illegal but deploying it deliberately against civilians or in a civilian setting violates the rules of war. Israel says it complies with international law over its use." (Trew 2023)) one family member had died, a bin collector and janitor had been killed outside, and could not be buried. The church's generators had been destroyed due to the bombs, along with their solar panels, water tanks, and fuel resources.

Israeli tanks were stationed nearby, while IDF snipers had taken up positions in the apartment blocks that overlooked the compound, making movement between buildings in the limestone complex very dangerous. Moran later added that anyone approaching the church was shot on sight.

=== December ===
By mid-December, an estimated 19,453 Gazans had been killed by Israeli fire. On 14 December, two technicians engaged in repairing water pipes that had been damaged by gunfire were shot dead by snipers. (Note: "Deux jours avant la mort de Samar et Nahisa Anton, deux techniciens chargés de réparer les conduites d'eau qui avaient été endommagées par des tirs, ont été eux aussi abattus par des snipers." (De blanpré 2023))

== Deaths ==
=== Pre-killing ===
Nahida Anton was the mother of the largest Catholic family in the Gaza Strip, with 7 children and more than 20 grandchildren. Her daughter Samar worked as a cook for the physically and mentally disabled children being cared for by the Teresan nuns of the Missionaries of Charity. Nahida originally hailed from a Palestinian refugee family and was born in 1953 in Dbayeh, Lebanon, where a sector of the camp still cares for Palestinian and Syrian Christian refugees. Her family was forced to flee to Yemen in the wake of the Israeli invasion of Lebanon in 1982. She eventually managed to make her way back to the Gaza Strip, where she dedicated herself to voluntary work for the local Catholic community. Her daughter Samar was 49.

On the morning of 16 December, according to the Latin Patriarchate of Jerusalem, an Israeli tank targeted and struck the Missionaries of Charity convent, which housed 54 disabled people. The shelling caused a large explosion, destroying the church's electricity generator and reserves of fuel. A follow-up barrage of two shells rendered the hospice uninhabitable, forcing the residents to be displaced and depriving several of the respiratory ventilators their condition required. Father Youssef, a Gazan priest, endeavoured, with a defective cell-phone contact, to get the Patriarchate to convey to the IDF that their area was a designated safe zone. The IDF later said that an exchange between it and the Holy Parish authorities had occurred that morning in which the latter stated that they had not suffered casualties.

=== Killing ===
Around noon, Edward Anton, Samar's brother who worked with Doctors without Borders (DWB), thought he had observed the Israeli military outside the church and shouted warnings to those sheltering in the building to stay inside. According to his account his mother had been shot while crossing the courtyard over to a bathroom and had not heard his warnings. Nahida was shot three times, once in the stomach. When Samar rushed out and attempted to succor her fallen mother and drag her to safety, she in turn was shot in the head, under the ear. The killings were observed directly by one of the resident nuns, Sister Nabila Saleh.

Over roughly the next ten minutes, a further seven people were shot and wounded, among them Edward Anton, who was shot in the leg and other family relatives—Dr. Elias, a surgeon, and a 16-year-old cousin who attempted to help the downed couple. (Note: "(Edward Anton's) father, his wife, and three nephews, aged twenty-four, sixteen, and fifteen, had all been injured, along with two others." Two were the children of Issa Antoun (Robbins 2024; Berger, Bellware & Masih 2023).) or while trying to protect others inside the church compound. According to the Patriarchate: "No warning was given, no notification was provided. They were shot in cold blood inside the premises of the Parish, where there are no belligerents". Both Hamas and the Patriarchate stated that an Israeli sniper had been responsible for killing the two women. Later Israeli bulldozers piled up wrecked cars from the street to block the church door.

=== Post-killing ===
The sister of one of the civilians in the compound told the BBC that those in the church were scared to leave for fear of being shot at, adding that: "they believed the Israelis were shooting anything that moves". Further fatalities occurred when the Israeli troops prevented medical aid from reaching the wounded. The wounded had to wait until Christmas Eve to be evacuated to the Anglican al-Ahli Arab Hospital—which had already suffered severe damage from an explosion on 17 October- where the required surgeries were not possible since many of the personnel had been detained during an Israeli raid on al-Ahli Arab Hospital on 19 December, leaving the hospital understaffed.

== IDF investigation ==
Initially, the IDF stated that the incidents occurred during a blitz programmed to look for armaments in the area. Following an internal investigation, the IDF said that Hamas had fired an RPG from the vicinity of the church, and that IDF soldiers had fired back and hit Hamas spotters, while Catholic Church officials maintained there were no Palestinian belligerents in the area. In January the IDF backtracked on its original conclusions, saying that it would undertake a further examination of the incident.

== Reaction ==
=== Holy See ===
The sequence of events, from the bombing of Saint Porphyrius Church on 19 October, which killed 18 civilians and wounded 20, to the destruction of the Holy Rosary School, the serious damage caused to the house of the Missionaries of Charity, and the killing of Nahida and Samar all contributed to aggravating the already strained relations between the Vatican and Israel. Pope Francis himself maintained a near daily telephone contact with the Catholic parish in Gaza. According to The Washington Post, in late October, in a telephone call to the Israeli President Isaac Herzog, Pope Francis affirmed his view that fighting terrorism with terrorism was forbidden. He condemned the attack and said: "Some would say 'It is war. It is terrorism.' Yes, it is war. It is terrorism".

This was the second time that the Pope had used the word "terrorism" while speaking of events in Gaza, angering some Israelis. The Archbishop of Westminster, Cardinal Vincent Nichols, the most senior Catholic figure in the United Kingdom, said: "They were shot in cold blood inside the premises of the Parish, where there are no belligerents".

=== Israeli response ===
When the website of the Latin Patriarchate of Jerusalem condemned the killing of the two women on 16 December, the Israeli ambassador to the Vatican lashed back, accusing the patriarchate of engaging in blood libel.

The Israeli military said it had not targeted the church and that church representatives had not mentioned an attack or civilian deaths when they spoke to the IDF on the morning of 16 December. Tal Heinrich, a spokeswoman from Prime Minister Benjamin Netanyahu denied that there had been any fighting the area of the church. Deputy Mayor of Jerusalem Fleur Hassan-Nahoum, speaking on LBC, was asked about reports of snipers outside the church, and she responded by falsely claiming there are no churches in Gaza and that Christians had been driven out by Hamas. Bishop Atallah Hanna, the Greek Orthodox Archbishop of Sebastia, publicly dismissed her assertions by noting that the presence of Gazan Christians had been attested for centuries. Hassan-Nahoum later backtracked and confessed she had seen no reports.

=== Palestinian response ===
Mitri Raheb, a Palestinian Lutheran pastor in Bethlehem, told reporters that the deaths were heartbreaking and that it made people angry, referencing other attacks by the IDF on Gaza's churches such as the Church of Saint Porphyrius attack which damaged Gaza's oldest Greek Orthodox church and killed at least 18 people.

==== Western response ====
Italian Foreign Minister Antonio Tajani condemned the killings, saying: "An [Israeli] sniper shot two women inside a church. This has nothing to do with the fight against Hamas because the terrorists are certainly not hiding in Christian churches".

British member of Parliament, Layla Moran who has family members sheltering in the church's grounds spoke out about the attack and deaths on social media stating her family members were "beyond desperate and terrified".

== See also ==
- Israeli war crimes
- Israeli war crimes in the Gaza war
- Palestinian Christians
- Manuel Musallam
- Timeline of the Israeli–Palestinian conflict in 2023
