= Emigration of Christians from Israel and Palestine =

Historical and contemporary emigration of Palestinian Christian communities

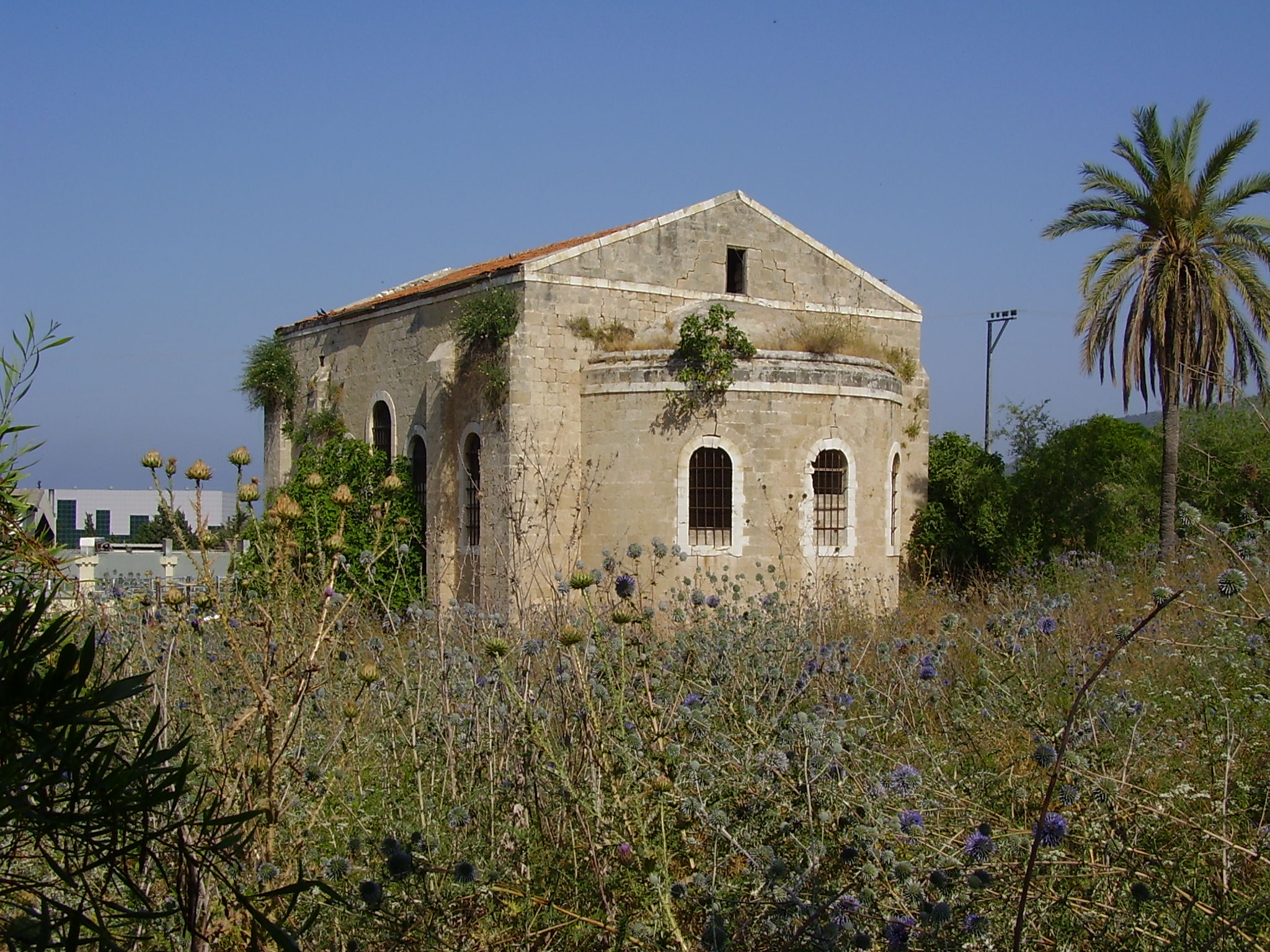
Abandoned church in Al-Bassa, 2008

Palestinian Christian communities have been emigrating from both Palestine and Israel. Scholars characterize this emigration as a structurally driven phenomenon linked to political conflict, economic pressures, and migration networks, rather than religious persecution.

Prior to the Nakba, 135,550 Christians lived in Mandatory Palestine, of which 110,200 (81%) lived in areas that are today Israel and East Jerusalem, and 25,350 (19%) in what is now the West Bank and the Gaza Strip. The most recent censuses show 180,300 Christians in Israel (including East Jerusalem), of which c.141,900 (79%) are Arab Christians (Palestinian Christians), and 46,850 Christians in the Palestinian territories.

The phenomenon is part of the wider trend of Palestinian emigration, which has been higher among Christians due to historical circumstances, and part of a wider trend among Arab Christians.

== Causes ==
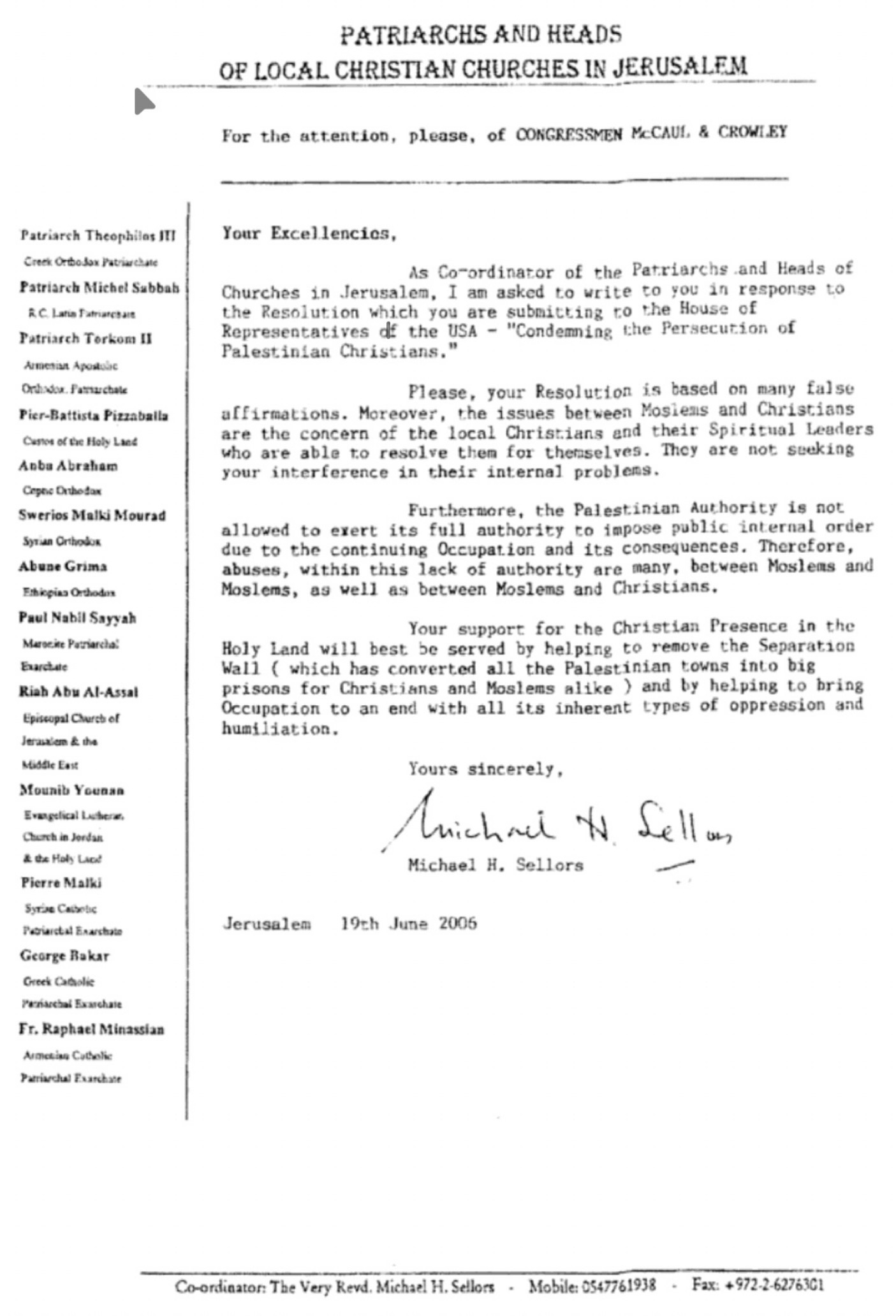
2006 letter to the U.S. House Committee on International Relations with respect to a proposed resolution entitled: "Condemning the Persecution of Palestinian Christians," stating that the proposed resolution was "based on many false affirmations". (Note: The letter was sent on behalf of: Patriarch Theophilos III of Jerusalem, Greek Orthodox Patriarchate of Jerusalem, Michel Sabbah, Latin Patriarchate of Jerusalem, Torkom Manoogian, Armenian Patriarchate of Jerusalem, Pierbattista Pizzaballa, Custody of the Holy Land, Anba Abraham, Coptic Orthodox Church, Severius Malki Mourad, Syriac Orthodox Church, Abune Grima, Ethiopian Orthodox Tewahedo Church, Paul Nabil El-Sayah, Maronite Church, Riah Abu El-Assal, Episcopal Church in Jerusalem and the Middle East, Munib Younan, Evangelical Lutheran Church in Jordan and the Holy Land, Pierre Malki, Syriac Catholic Church, George Rakar, Melkite Greek Catholic Church, Raphaël Bedros XXI Minassian, and Armenian Catholic Patriarchal Exarchate.)

=== Economic factors ===
Christian emigration is often undertaken in pursuit of better living standards, and primarily driven by economic considerations. The Jerusalem Post stated in 2009 that the "shrinking of the Palestinian Christian community in the Holy Land came as a direct result of its middle-class standards". A survey carried out in 1993 showed that "the poor economic situation is cited as a cause for emigration by the overwhelming majority of those intending to leave, with the political conditions given as a second reason." A 2020 survey showed a similar result: "The largest percentage indicate that their desire to emigrate stems from economic reasons".

In a 2020 study, similar factors were noted with respect to emigration of Christian communities in Gaza.

=== Chain migration ===
Chain migration is a significant factor particularly from areas such as Bethlehem and adjacent towns which produced some of the largest Palestinian Christian communities outside the Middle East. Scholars note that remittances and return visits have mitigated—but not reversed—the long-term population decline of Christian communities in Palestine.

Transnational family networks have shaped emigration among Palestinian Christians, providing knowledge of and access to opportunities abroad. Long-standing migration to the Americas created dense networks and family business structures that provided economic support and reduced the risks associated with relocation. These networks influenced migrants’ destinations and facilitated the establishment of new diaspora hubs. In addition, the emigration of entire family groups weakened ties to local communities, contributing to further pressure for outward migration.

=== Birth rates ===
The Christian share of overall population has also decreased due to low birth rates compared to both Jewish and Muslim communities. In Israel in 2024, Jewish and Muslim women had a fertility rate of 3.10 and 2.68 children respectively, significantly higher that the 1.62 fertility rate amongst Christian women.

=== Israeli-Palestinian conflict, and intercommunal relations ===
The Vatican and the Catholic Church blamed the Israeli-Palestinian conflict for the Christian exodus from the Holy Land and the Middle East in general.

In a 2006 poll of Christians in Bethlehem by the Palestinian Centre for Research and Cultural Dialogue, 90% reported having Muslim friends, 73% agreed that the Palestinian Authority treats Christian heritage in the city with respect, and 78% attributed the ongoing exodus of Christians from Bethlehem to the Israeli West Bank barrier causing an economic crisis in Bethlehem. Daniel Rossing, the Israeli Ministry of Religious Affairs' chief liaison to Christians in the 1970s and 1980s, has stated that the situation for them in Gaza became much worse after the election of Hamas. He also stated that the Palestinian Authority, which counts on Christian westerners for financial support, treats the minority fairly.

The United States State Department's 2006 report on religious freedom criticized both Israel for its restrictions on travel to Christian holy sites and the Palestinian Authority for its failure to stamp out anti-Christian crime. It also reported that the former gives preferential treatment in basic civic services to Jews and the latter does so to Muslims. The report stated that, generally, ordinary Muslim and Christian citizens enjoy good relations in contrast to the "strained" Jewish and Arab relations. A 2005 BBC report also described Muslim and Christian relations as generally "peaceful", while noting that some Christians complain of harassment and discrimination. The Arab Human Rights Association, an Arab NGO in Israel, has stated that Israeli authorities have denied Palestinian Christians in Israel access to holy places, prevented repairs needed to preserve historic holy sites, and carried out physical attacks on religious leaders. Kairos Palestine—an independent coalition Christian organisation, set up to help communicate to the Christian world what is happening in Palestine—sent a letter to The Wall Street Journal to explain that "In the case of Bethlehem, for instance, it is in fact the rampant construction of Israeli settlements, the chokehold imposed by the separation wall and the Israeli government's confiscation of Palestinian land that has driven many Christians to leave."

Contrary to some claims, the emigration phenomenon is not primarily driven by Muslim-Christian relations. The Jerusalem Post stated that Muslim pressure has not played a major role according to Christian residents themselves. Hanna Siniora, a prominent Christian Palestinian human rights activist, has attributed harassment against Christians to "little groups" of "hoodlums" rather than to the Hamas and Fatah governments. In his last novel, the Palestinian Christian writer Emile Habibi has a character affirm that: "There is no difference between Christian and Muslim: we are all Palestinian in our predicament."

=== Political and media claims ===
Blame games over the causes of Christian emigration from Palestine have become a recurring feature in media coverage of the Israeli–Palestinian conflict, in efforts to influence opinion of Christian communities in the West.

In 2006, a draft bill was introduced by Representatives Michael McCaul and Joseph Crowley, drafted by their staffers Ari Stein and Gregg Sheiowitz, which attributed the decline of the Christian population primarily to alleged failures by the Palestinian Authority. According to Professor Daphne Tsimhoni of the Israel Institute of Technology “almost all the bill's assertions are either exaggerations, misrepresentations or sheer fabrications.” Representatives of churches in Palestine submitted a letter to the U.S. House Committee on International Relations stating that the resolution misrepresented the causes of Christian emigration by emphasizing internal religious or political factors while omitting the impact of the Israeli occupation of the West Bank, including movement restrictions and economic constraints. Critics noted that the resolution had been drafted without consultation with Palestinian Christian institutions and risked reinforcing politicized narratives about Christian–Muslim relations in the region. The resolution was quietly withdrawn following the criticism.

In 2012, the CBS News program 60 Minutes aired a report titled “Christians of the Holy Land”, presented by correspondent Bob Simon, examining the decline of Christian communities in Bethlehem, Jerusalem, and surrounding areas. The segment linked emigration to conditions associated with the broader Israeli–Palestinian conflict, including restrictions on movement and economic pressures. Michael Oren, then Israeli ambassador to the United States, attempted to influence CBS to withdraw it prior to publication, arguing that it placed disproportionate blame on Israel. Simon responded by defending the reporting both on air and in subsequent interviews, stating that the segment reflected the testimony of local Christian residents and clergy and was consistent with available historical and empirical research.

== History ==
=== Early emigration ===
Christian emigration from Palestine predates the Arab–Israeli conflict, beginning in the late Ottoman period and intensifying during the British Mandate, when drought, economic marginalization, and early transnational family networks facilitated large-scale movement to the Americas. Scholarly studies describe this emigration as structural rather than episodic, rooted in unequal access to land, capital, and political power rather than solely in sectarian relations.

Thousands of Christian Palestinians "emigrated to Latin America in the 1920s, when Mandatory Palestine was hit by drought and a severe economic depression." Today, Chile houses the largest Palestinian Christian community in the world outside of the Levant. As many as 350,000 Palestinians reside in Chile, most of whose families came from Christian villages such as Bethlehem and surrounding villages. Also, El Salvador, Honduras, Brazil, Colombia, Argentina, Venezuela, and other Latin American countries have significant Palestinian Christian communities, some of whom immigrated almost a century ago during the time of Ottoman Palestine.

=== Nakba ===
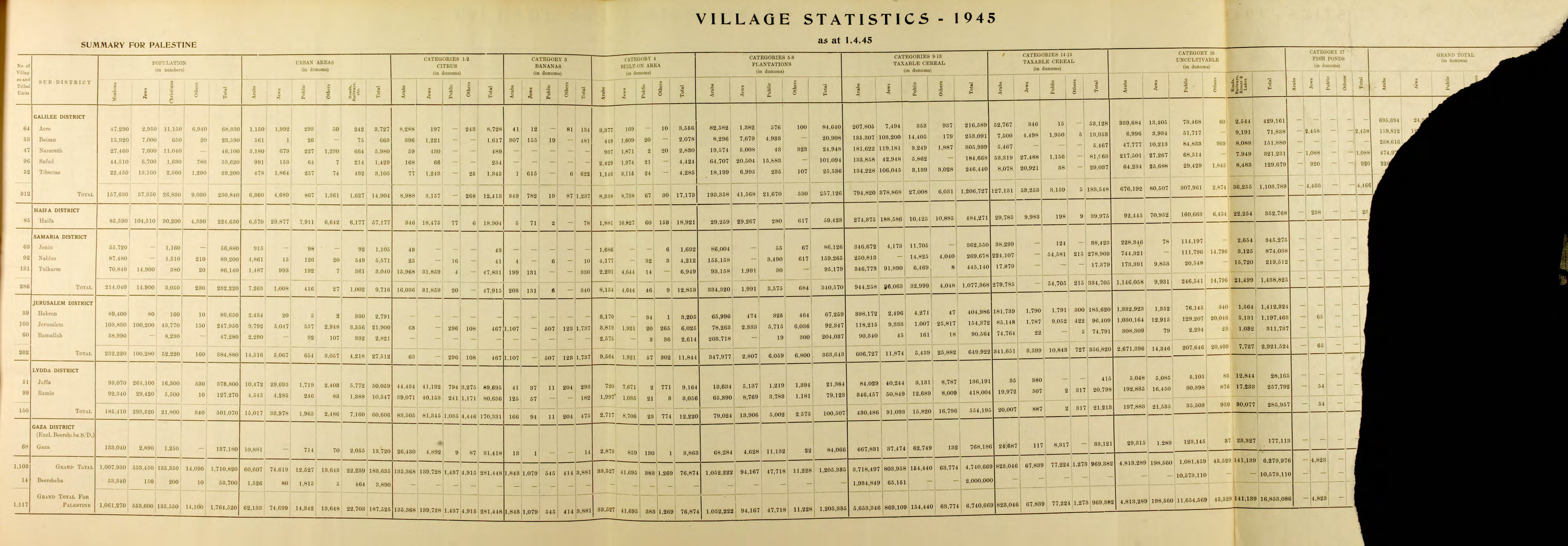
The Mandatory Palestine census statistics shown in Village Statistics, 1945 gave a Christian population of 135,550. The tables below show the villages organized by modern jurisdiction: of the 135,550, there were 110,200 (81%) in what is now modern Israel and East Jerusalem (split 105,450 and 4,750 between communities with more than 250 and those with less than 250 Christians), and 25,350 (19%) in what is now the West Bank (excluding East Jerusalem and Israeli settlements) and the Gaza Strip (split 23,950 and 1,400 between communities with more than 250 and those with less than 250 Christians).

Prior to the Nakba, 135,550 Christians lived in Mandatory Palestine, of which 110,200 (81%) lived in areas that are today Israel and East Jerusalem, and 25,350 (19%) in what is now the West Bank and the Gaza Strip. Palestinian Christians were disproportionately affected by displacement, with an estimated 35–40% becoming refugees, accelerating the demographic contraction of historic Christian centers such as Jaffa, West Jerusalem, and Galilee towns. Subsequent Israeli policies restricting return, residency rights, family reunification, land use, and access to employment have been identified as long-term drivers of Christian out-migration from East Jerusalem and the West Bank.

From 1948 to the early 1950s, Ben-Gurion's Transfer Committee authorized projects for the transference of the Christian communities of the Galilee to Argentina, but the proposal failed in the face of Christian opposition.

=== Current period ===
In 2024, according to the Israel Central Bureau of Statistics, there were 180,300 Christians in Israel (including East Jerusalem), of which c.141,900 (79%) are Arab Christians (Palestinian Christians) living in the Northern District (68%, c.96,500), Haifa District (15%, c.21,300) and other areas (17%), with 44% in just three locations: Nazareth and Nof HaGalil (30,300 combined), Haifa (18,700) and Jerusalem (13,100). The c.38,400 non-Arab Christians live mainly in the Tel Aviv District and Central District (41% combined), and in the Northern and Haifa Districts (35% combined).

In 2017, the most recent census by the Palestinian Central Bureau of Statistics, there were 46,850 Christians in the Palestinian territories, the vast majority living in the West Bank, which accounted for 45,712 Christians (c.98%), while the Gaza Strip was home to just 1,138 Christians (c.2%). Christian communities in the West Bank were highly concentrated, with nearly three-quarters living in three governorates: the Bethlehem Governorate (23,165; 51%), the Ramallah & Al-Bireh Governorate (10,255; 22%), and the Jerusalem Governorate (8,558; 19%). Smaller Christian populations were present in the Jenin Governorate (2,699), the Nablus Governorate (601), the Jericho & Al-Aghwar Governorate (285), and other governorates, each accounting for less than 2% of the total. In the Gaza Strip, Christians were concentrated primarily in the Gaza Governorate (1,082; 95%), with very small communities in the North Gaza, Khan Yunis, Rafah, and Deir Al-Balah Governorates.

Most of the Gaza Strip's Christian population lived in Gaza City, in the northern part of the Gaza Strip. As of October 2024, most of Gaza's Christians had decided to remain in the churches' compounds in northern Gaza. In November 2024, Israel announced that no Palestinians would be allowed to "return" to North Gaza.

=== Population tables ===
The tables below show the Christian population of Mandatory Palestine by location, compared to the modern day Christian population for the same location where available. The first table shows each location in modern Israel and East Jerusalem in which more than 250 Christians were living in 1945, and the second shows the locations with less than 250 Christians each in the same area. The following two tables are equivalent, showing the Christian population of the West Bank and Gaza Strip.

Locations in 1945 Mandatory Palestine with >250 Christians – currently under Israeli jurisdiction (Israel and East Jerusalem), ordered by 1945 Christian population
	1945 population		Nakba population impact	Current population			
	Christians	%	Nakba population impact	Modern jurisdiction	Christians	%	Date
Jerusalem	29,350	19%	Partly depopulated	Israel and East Jerusalem	12,760	1%	2022
Haifa	26,570	19%	Depopulated	Israel	16,840	6%	2022
Jaffa	15,400	16%	Depopulated	Israel			
Nazareth	8,600	61%	Addition of IDPs	Israel	20,910	27%	2022
Ramle	3,260	22%	Depopulated	Israel	3,720	5%	2022
Acre	2,330	19%	Depopulated	Israel	1,390	3%	2022
Lydda	1,840	11%	Depopulated	Israel	770	0.9%	2022
El Bassa	1,590	54%	Expelled and destroyed	Israel	0	0	-
Shafa ‘Amr	1,560	43%	Addition of IDPs	Israel	10,620	24%	2022
Er Rama	1,160	69%	Addition of IDPs	Israel	3,880	50%	2022
I'billin	1,060	64%	Addition of IDPs	Israel	5,790	42%	2022
Kafr Yasif	1,010	72%	Addition of IDPs	Israel	5,450	52%	2022
Deir el Qasi and El Mansura	880	70%	Depopulated	Israel	0	0	-
Maghar and El Mansura	800	37%	Addition of IDPs, and depopulated	Israel	5,110	21%	2022
Mi'ilya	790	88%	Addition of IDPs	Israel	3,270	100%	2022
Tiberias	760	7%	Evacuated and refused reentry	Israel	n.a.	n.a.	2022
Kafr Bir‘im	700	99%	Expelled and destroyed	Israel	0	0	-
Tarshiha	690	18%	Addition of IDPs	Israel	2,430	11%	2022
Ein Karim	670	21%	Depopulated	Israel	0	0	-
Kafr Kanna	610	32%	Addition of IDPs	Israel	2,270	9.4%	2022
Eilabun	530	96%	Addition of IDPs	Israel	4,090	71%	2022
Er Reina	500	39%	Addition of IDPs	Israel	2,830	15%	2022
Yafa	490	46%	Addition of IDPs	Israel	3,410	17%	2022
Iqrith	460	94%	Expelled and destroyed	Israel	0	0	-
Beisan	430	8%	Depopulated	Israel	n.a.	n.a.	-
Safad	430	4%	Depopulated	Israel	n.a.	n.a.	2022
Et Tur	390	14%	Addition of refugees	East Jerusalem	n.a.	n.a.	
Abu Sinan	380	46%	Addition of IDPs	Israel	2,200	15%	2022
El Buqeia	370	37%	Addition of IDPs	Israel	1,280	21%	2022
Jish	350	32%	Addition of IDPs	Israel	2,030	63%	2022
Tur‘an	340	25%	Addition of IDPs	Israel	1,610	11%	2022
Isfiya	300	17%	Addition of IDPs	Israel	1,770	14%	2022
El Bi'na	300	36%	Addition of IDPs	Israel	640	7%	2022
Sakhnin	290	11%	Addition of IDPs	Israel	1,660	5%	2022
El Mujeidil	260	14%	Depopulated	Israel	0	0	-
Subtotal	105,450	77.8% of the 135,550 Christian population (1945)					

Locations in 1945 Mandatory Palestine with <250 Christians – currently under Israeli jurisdiction (Israel and East Jerusalem), ordered by 1945 Christian population
	1945 population		Nakba population impact	Current population			
	Christians	%	Nakba population impact	Modern jurisdiction	Christians	%	Date
Wilhelma	240	100%	Depopulated (Templer)	Israel	0	0	-
Tel Aviv	230	0%	-	Israel			
Deir Hanna	210	28%	Addition of IDPs	Israel	1,090	10%	2022
Beersheba	200	4%	Depopulated	Israel			
Ma'lul	200	29%	Depopulated	Israel	0	0	-
Sirin	190	23%	Depopulated	Israel	0	0	-
Latrun	190	100%	Depopulated	Israel	0	0	-
Buraq	180	7%	Depopulated	Israel	0	0	-
Beit Lahm	160	43%	Depopulated (Templer)	Israel	0	0	-
Sarona	150	100%	Depopulated (Templer)	Israel	0	0	-
Silwan	140	4%	Addition of refugees	East Jerusalem			
Ijzim	140	5%	Depopulated	Israel	0	0	-
El Birwa	130	9%	Depopulated	Israel	0	0	-
Judeida	130	46%	Addition of IDPs	Israel			
Samakh	130	4%	Depopulated	Israel	0	0	-
Beit Jimal	120	50%	Depopulated	Israel	0	0	-
Waldheim (Umm el ‘Amad)	110	42%	Depopulated (Templer)	Israel			
Sarafand el Kharab	110	11%	Depopulated	Israel	0	0	-
El Makr	100	20%	Addition of IDPs	Israel			
Deir Rifat	100	23%	Depopulated	Israel	0	0	-
Abil el Qamh	100	30%	Depopulated	Israel	0	0	-
El Majdal	90	1%	Depopulated	Israel			
Ed Damin	70	5%	Depopulated	Israel	0	0	-
Suhmata	70	6%	Depopulated	Israel	0	0	-
Atlit	60	9%	Depopulated	Israel	0	0	-
Salama	60	1%	Depopulated	Israel	0	0	-
Umm el Fahm	60	1%	Addition of IDPs	Israel			
Yajur	50	8%	Depopulated	Israel	0	0	-
Samakiya (Es)	50	13%	Depopulated	Israel	0	0	-
Esh Shajara	50	6%	Depopulated	Israel	0	0	-
Julis	40	5%	Addition of IDPs	Israel			
Kafr Sumei'	40	13%	Addition of IDPs	Israel			
Hirbīya	40	2%	Depopulated	Israel	0	0	-
Beit Safafa	40	3%	Addition of refugees	East Jerusalem			
Qaryat el ‘Inab (Abu Ghosh)	40	5%	Addition of IDPs	Israel			
Sarafand el ‘Amar	40	2%	Depopulated	Israel	0	0	-
Sha'ab	30	2%	Addition of IDPs	Israel			
Qisariya (Caesarea)	30	3%	Depopulated	Israel	0	0	-
Sabbirin	30	2%	Depopulated	Israel	0	0	-
Tira (Et)	30	1%	Addition of IDPs	Israel			
Palestine Potash Concession (North)	30	1%	Depopulated	Israeli settlement	0	0	-
Daburiyya	30	2%	Addition of IDPs	Israel			
Hurfeish	30	4%	Addition of IDPs	Israel			
Dalyat el Karmil	20	1%	Addition of IDPs	Israel			
Hadera	20	0%	-	Israel			
El Mansi	20	2%	Depopulated	Israel	0	0	-
Tantura	20	1%	Depopulated	Israel	0	0	-
Umm ez Zinat	20	1%	Depopulated	Israel	0	0	-
Kheiriya	20	1%	Depopulated	Israel	0	0	-
El Mas‘udiya (Summeil)	20	2%	Depopulated	Israel	0	0	-
El Yahudiya	20	0%	Depopulated	Israel	0	0	-
Yazur	20	0%	Depopulated	Israel	0	0	-
Lifta	20	1%	Depopulated	Israel	0	0	-
Na‘ana (Ni‘ana)	20	1%	Depopulated	Israel	0	0	-
Rehovot	20	0%	-	Israel			
Yibna	20	0%	Depopulated	Israel	0	0	-
El Khalisa	20	1%	Depopulated	Israel	0	0	-
Dahamiya	20	5%	Depopulated	Israel	0	0	-
Tabigha (Et)	20	6%	Depopulated	Israel	0	0	-
Yirka	10	1%	Addition of IDPs	Israel			
Jisr al-Majami'	10	4%	Expelled and destroyed	Israel	0	0	-
El Murassas	10	2%	Expelled and destroyed	Israel	0	0	-
Es Samiriya	10	4%	Expelled and destroyed	Israel	0	0	-
Hamāma	10	0%	Expelled and destroyed	Israel	0	0	-
Masmiya el Kabīra, El	10	0%	Expelled and destroyed	Israel	0	0	-
Es Sawāfīr es Sharqīya	10	1%	Expelled and destroyed	Israel	0	0	-
Ajjur	10	0%	Expelled and destroyed	Israel	0	0	-
Petah Tikva	10	0%	-	Israel			
Deiraban	10	0%	Expelled and destroyed	Israel	0	0	-
Deir esh Sheikh	10	5%	Expelled and destroyed	Israel	0	0	-
Malha (El)	10	1%	Expelled and destroyed	Israel	n.a.	n.a.	-
Qaluniya	10	1%	Expelled and destroyed	Israel	0	0	-
Saffuriya	10	0%	Expelled and destroyed	Israel	0	0	-
Umm Khalid	10	1%	Expelled and destroyed	Israel	0	0	-
Isawiya	10	1%	Addition of refugees	East Jerusalem			
Subtotal	4,750	3.5% of the 135,550 Christian population (1945)					

Locations in 1945 Mandatory Palestine with >250 Christians – currently under Palestinian jurisdiction (West Bank and Gaza Strip), ordered by 1945 Christian population
	1945 population		Nakba population impact	Current population			
	Christians	%	Nakba population impact	Modern jurisdiction	Christians	%	Date
Bethlehem	6,430	73%	Addition of refugees	West Bank	7,140	28%	2008
Ramallah	4,440	87%	Addition of refugees	West Bank	6,120	22%	2008
Beit Jala	3,510	95%	Addition of refugees	West Bank	7,140	61%	2008
Beit Sahur	2,400	87%	Addition of refugees	West Bank	8,160	66%	2008
Et Taiyiba	1,180	89%	Addition of refugees	West Bank	1,300	90%	2008
Gaza	1,010	3%	Addition of refugees	Gaza Strip	1,000	<1%	2025
Bir Zeit	990	63%	Addition of refugees	West Bank	2,244	50%	2008
Ez Zabubida	780	90%	Addition of refugees	West Bank	2,500	68%	2008
Nablus	680	3%	Addition of refugees	West Bank			
Jifna	580	64%	Addition of refugees	West Bank	1,122	65%	2008
Abud	530	49%	Addition of refugees	West Bank	1,224	59%	2008
Rafidiya	350	81%	Addition of refugees	West Bank			
El Bira	280	10%	Addition of refugees	West Bank			
Tulkarm	280	3%	Addition of refugees	West Bank			
Jericho	260	9%	Addition of refugees	West Bank			
Ein ‘Arik	250	41%	Addition of refugees	West Bank	500	32%	2008
Subtotal	23,950	17.7% of the 135,550 Christian population (1945)					

Locations in 1945 Mandatory Palestine with <250 Christians – currently under Palestinian jurisdiction (West Bank and Gaza Strip), ordered by 1945 Christian population
	1945 population		Nakba population impact	Current population			
	Christians	%	Nakba population impact	Modern jurisdiction	Christians	%	Date
Nisf Jubeil	180	69%	Addition of refugees	West Bank			
Hebron	150	1%	Addition of refugees	West Bank			
Jenin	150	4%	Addition of refugees	West Bank	306	1%	2008
Beit Dajan	130	3%	Addition of refugees	West Bank			
Birqin	110	7%	Addition of refugees	West Bank	63	1%	2008
Artas	110	14%	Addition of refugees	West Bank			
Qubeiba	80	19%	Partial depopulation	West Bank	11	0.3%	2008
Arraba	60	3%	Addition of refugees	West Bank			
Tubas	60	1%	Addition of refugees	West Bank			
Deir el Balaḥ	40	2%	Addition of refugees	Gaza Strip			
Khān Yūnis	40	0%	Addition of refugees	Gaza Strip			
Sabastiya	40	4%	Addition of refugees	West Bank			
Anabta and Iktaba	40	1%	Addition of refugees	West Bank			
Deir Ghazala	30	11%	Addition of refugees	West Bank	8	1%	2008
Eizariya (El)	20	2%	Addition of refugees	West Bank	550	3%	2008
Aqqaba	20	3%	Addition of refugees	West Bank			
Ein Siniya	20	6%	Addition of refugees	West Bank			
Kafr Malik	20	2%	Addition of refugees	West Bank			
Azzun and En Nabi Ilyas	20	2%	Addition of refugees	West Bank			
Mazra'a (El)	10	2%	Addition of refugees	West Bank			
Jaba‘	10	0%	Addition of refugees	West Bank			
Kafr Qud	10	4%	Addition of refugees	West Bank	24	2%	2008
Kufeir	10	7%	Addition of refugees	West Bank			
Bureij	10	1%	Addition of refugees	Gaza Strip			
Far‘un	10	1%	Addition of refugees	West Bank			
Kafr Sur	10	2%	Addition of refugees	West Bank			
Qalqilya	10	0%	Addition of refugees	West Bank			
Jalamah	0	0%	Addition of refugees	West Bank	50	2%	2008
Subtotal	1,400	1.0% of the 135,550 Christian population (1945)					

== See also ==
- Demographic history of Palestine (region)

== Bibliography ==
- Kårtveit, Bård (2014-09-04). Dilemmas of Attachment: Identity and Belonging among Palestinian Christians. BRILL. ISBN 978-90-04-27639-0.
- Khalidi, W. (1992). All That Remains: The Palestinian Villages Occupied and Depopulated by Israel in 1948. Washington D.C.: Institute for Palestine Studies. ISBN 0-88728-224-5.
- Sabella, Bernard (1998-09-24). "The Emigration of Christian Arabs: Dimensions and Causes of the Phenomenon". Christian Communities in the Arab Middle East The Challenge of the Future. Oxford University PressOxford. doi:10.1093/oso/9780198293880.003.0007. ISBN 978-0-19-829388-0.
- Schouten, Lucy (2020-11-09). "Why Church Leaders Discourage Christians from Leaving Jordan: An Anti-Emigration Perspective". Exchange. 49 (3–4): 339–357. doi:10.1163/1572543X-12341573. ISSN 0166-2740.
- Tsimhoni, Daphne (2016-02-15). "14 - Christians in the State of Israel: Between Integration and Emigration". In Allen D. Hertzke; Timothy Samuel Shah (eds.). Christianity and Freedom. Cambridge University Press. pp. 397–430. doi:10.1017/cbo9781316408643. ISBN 978-1-107-12472-1.
- Fawadleh, Hadeel (2015). "Emigration of Arab Christians from Palestine: Ramallah-Al-Bireh District-A Case study / هجرة المسيحيين العرب من فلسطين: محافظة رام الله والبيرة انموذجا". Bethlehem University Journal. 33. Pluto Journals: 146–165. ISSN 2521-3695. JSTOR 26448665.
- Felson, Ethan; Schlesinger, Marc (2011), JCPA Background Paper: The Palestinian Christian Population (PDF), Jerusalem Center for Public Affairs, archived from the original (PDF) on 25 May 2024
- Al Qass Collings, Rania; Kassis, Rifat Odeh; Raheb, Mitri (2008), Palestinian Christians, Facts, Figures and Trends, 2008 (PDF), Diyar Consortium, archived from the original (PDF) on 2013-10-24
- Hazran, Yusri (2019-07-03). "Emigration of Christians from the Arab Middle East: A New Reading". The Journal of the Middle East and Africa. 10 (3): 189–210. doi:10.1080/21520844.2019.1645524. ISSN 2152-0844.
- Shikaki, Khalil; Ladadweh, Walid (8 June 2020), Migration of Palestinian Christians: Drivers and Means of Combating it (PDF), The Palestinian Center for Policy and Survey Research (PSR)
