= 30 Days (magazine) =

Defunct Italian magazine

- Frequency: Monthly
- Founder: Father Joseph Fessio
- First issue: 2 March 1988
- Final issue: Summer 2012
- Country: Italy
- Based in: Rome
- Language: Italian
- Website: 30 Days

30 Days (meaning 30 Giorni in Italian) was an Italian monthly magazine that covered Catholic geopolitics. It was widely read in the Roman Curia and existed between 1988 and 2012.

== History and profile ==
30 Days was first published on 2 March 1988. Father Joseph Fessio was the founder. The magazine was directed by the most "curial" of Italy's veteran Catholic politicians, senator for life Giulio Andreotti from 1993 to 2012. Published monthly in six languages, it reached all the dioceses of the world, and fully reflected the politics of Vatican diplomacy. The last issue of 30 Days appeared in Summer 2012.

== See also ==
- List of magazines published in Italy
