= AsiaNews =

Roman Catholic official publication

AsiaNews is an official press agency of the Catholic Church's Pontifical Institute for Foreign Missions (PIME). The editor-in-chief of AsiaNews is Father Bernardo Cervellera, a PIME missionary who also heads Agenzia Fides, the official news agency of the Vatican. Prominent British Bangladeshi journalist and human rights activist William Gomes worked for Asia news.

== Description ==
The Catholic press agencies MISNA and Zenit republish news from AsiaNews. Originally available in the Italian language, the website has since expanded into English and Chinese in 2003 to enhance the "missionary aspect of our news agency". AsiaNews's intended audience is Chinese university students, who it believes are "curi[ous] about Christianity" and may save China from being "a soulless market or ... dictatorship". It describes its presence as "urgent" because of what it calls the "empowerment" of atheism in Chinese schools and the "persecution" of Christians in China. AsiaNews describes itself as "a great accomplishment in evangelization, which is the work of God" and as "bolster[ing] the [Roman Catholic] Church's mission in China". The AsiaNews has professional correspondents from Bangladesh, India, Nepal, Sri Lanka, Vatican, Pakistan, China, Indonesia, and Russia, among other countries.
