= Gideon Levy =

Israeli journalist and author (born 1953)

- גדעון לוי
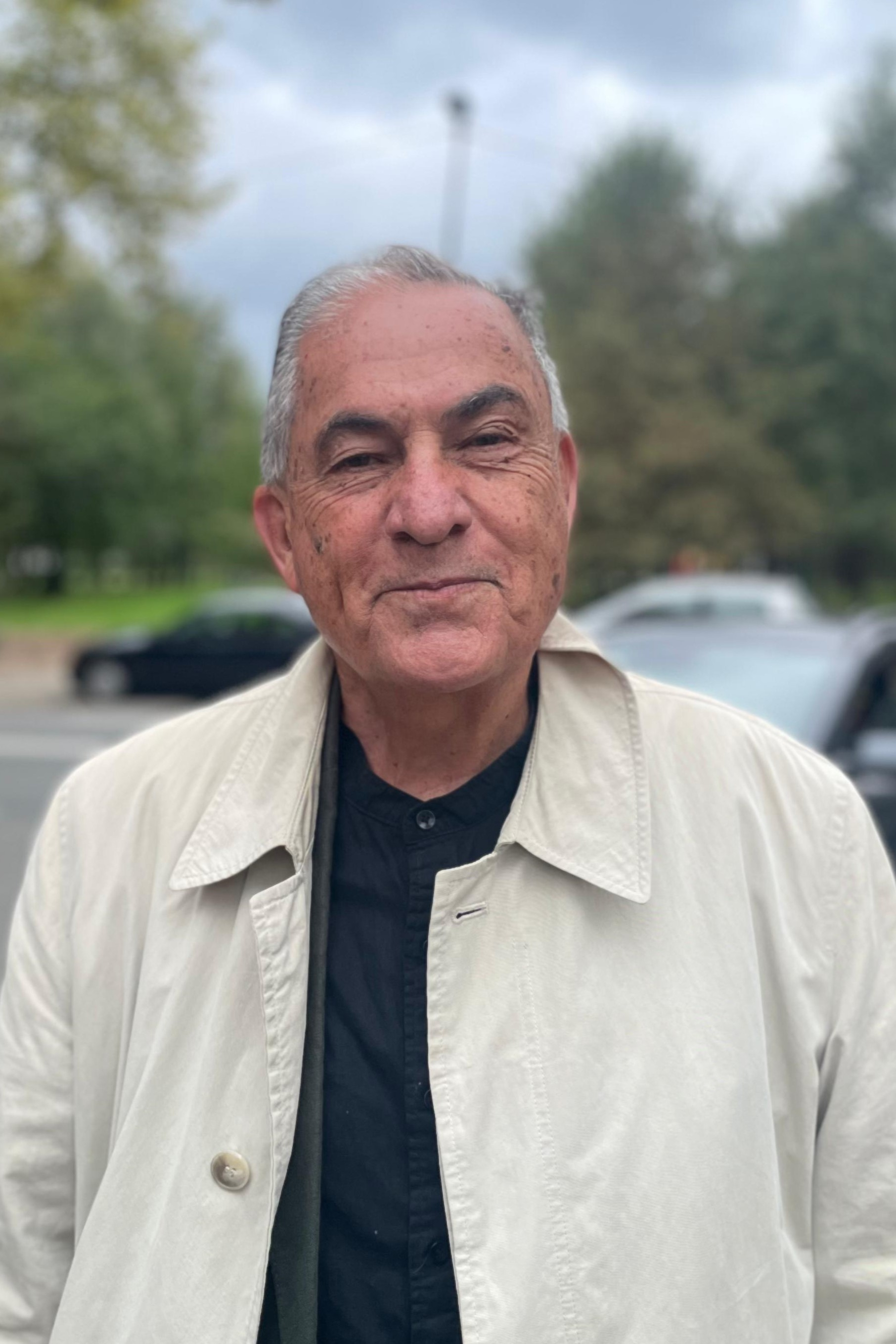
- Levy in 2025
- Born: 2 June 1953 (age 73); Tel Aviv, Israel
- Occupations: Journalist; author
- Awards: Olof Palme Prize (2015); Sokolov Award (2021)

Gideon Levy (Hebrew: גדעון לוי, pronounced [ɡidˈʔon leˈvi]; born 2 June 1953) is an Israeli journalist and author. Levy writes opinion pieces and a weekly column for the newspaper Haaretz that often focus on the Israeli occupation of the Palestinian territories. He has won prizes for his articles on human rights in the Israeli-occupied territories. In 2021, he won Israel's top award for journalism, the Sokolov Award.

== Biography ==
Levy was born in 1953 in Tel Aviv.

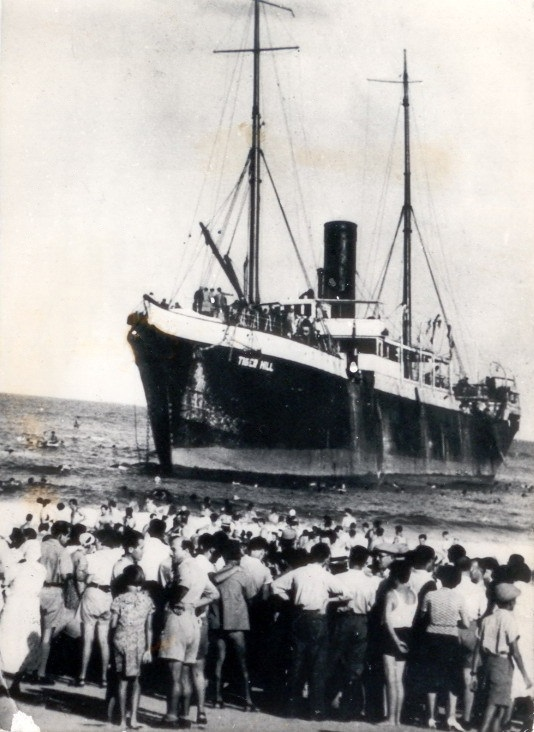
Tiger Hill beached at Tel Aviv on 1 September 1939

His father, Heinz (Zvi) Loewy, was born in the town of Saaz in the Sudetenland of Czechoslovakia, and earned a law degree from the University of Prague. He fled the Nazis in 1939, together with 800 other refugees, on a journey organized by two Slovak Jews. He spent six weeks as an illegal immigrant on the Panamanian-registered ship Frossoula, which was denied entry into Turkey and Palestine, and was permitted only temporary anchorage at Tripoli. He was then imprisoned in a detention camp at Beirut for six weeks, after which the group was allowed to leave aboard another Panamanian-registered ship, Tiger Hill, which reached Palestine on 1 September. Royal Air Force aircraft strafed the ship, killing two refugees, but its crew ran it aground on Frishman Beach in Tel Aviv, where the remaining refugees got ashore.

Levy's mother, Thea, from Ostrava, Czechoslovakia, was brought to Palestine in 1939 in a rescue operation for children and placed in a kibbutz. His grandparents were murdered in the Holocaust. His father opened a bakery in Herzliya with his sister and worked as a newspaper deliveryman and then an office clerk.

The family at first lived in poverty, but their lives became relatively comfortable when the German Holocaust reparations arrived. Levy attended Tel Aviv's Ironi Alef High School. He and his younger brother Rafi often sang together, notably songs by Haim Hefer. During the Six-Day War in 1967, Arab artillery hit the street adjacent to his home. In 2007, Levy said his political views as a teenager were mainstream: "I was a full member of the nationalistic religious orgy. We all were under the feeling that the whole project [of Israel] is in an existentialistic danger. We all felt that another Holocaust is around the corner."

== Journalism and media career ==
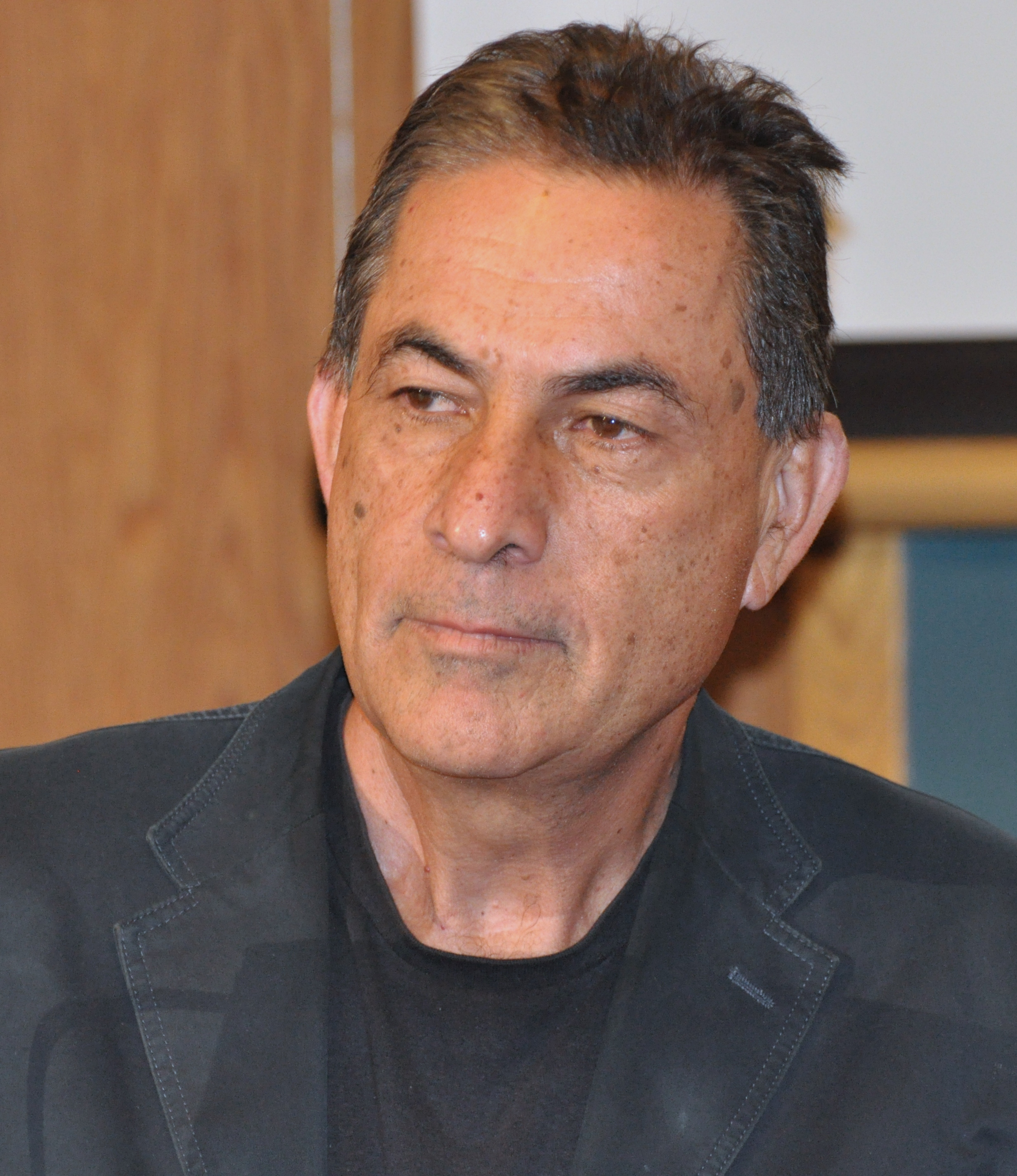
Levy in 2011

Levy was drafted into the Israel Defense Forces (IDF) in 1974 and served as a reporter for Army Radio. From 1978 to 1982, he worked as an aide and spokesman for Shimon Peres, then the leader of the Israeli Labor Party. In 1982, he began to write for the Israeli daily Haaretz. In 1983–87, he was a deputy editor. Despite his coverage of the Israeli–Palestinian conflict, he speaks no Arabic. Since 1988, he has written the column "Twilight Zone" about the hardships of the Palestinians. In 2004, Levy published Twilight Zone – Life and Death under the Israeli Occupation, a compilation of these columns. With Haim Yavin, he co-edited Whispering Embers, a documentary series on Russian Jewry after the fall of communism. He hosted A Personal Meeting with Gideon Levy, a weekly talk show that was broadcast on Israeli Channel 3, and has appeared periodically on other television talk shows.

Levy has said that his views on Israel's policies toward the Palestinians developed only after joining Haaretz. In a 2009 interview, he said, "When I first started covering the West Bank for Haaretz, I was young and brainwashed. ... I would see settlers cutting down olive trees and soldiers mistreating Palestinian women at the checkpoints, and I would think, 'These are exceptions, not part of government policy.' It took me a long time to see that these were not exceptions—they were the substance of government policy."

In an interview, Levy said he doubted that any Israeli newspaper other than Haaretz would give him the journalistic freedom to publish the kind of pieces he writes.

In 2011, Levy voiced support for Johann Hari, then writing for The Independent of London, who was accused of plagiarism, while confirming that Hari had lifted quotes from Levy's newspaper column.

In August 2013, Levy travelled to Malaysia, which has no diplomatic ties with Israel. He was accompanied by Palestinian minister Hind Khoury, and was granted entry by Malaysian authorities; Levy had been invited to Malaysia by former prime minister Mahathir Mohamad.

== Views ==
Levy calls himself a "patriotic Israeli". He criticizes what he sees as Israeli society's moral blindness to the effects of its acts of war and occupation. He has called the construction of settlements on private Palestinian land "the most criminal enterprise in [Israel's] history". He opposed the 2006 Lebanon War. In 2007, he said that the plight of Palestinians in the Gaza Strip, then under Israeli blockade, made him ashamed to be Israeli. "My modest mission is to prevent a situation in which many Israelis will be able to say 'We didn't know'", he has said.

Levy supports unilateral withdrawal from the occupied Palestinian territories without concessions. "Israel is not being asked 'to give' anything to the Palestinians; it is only being asked to return—to return their stolen land and restore their trampled self-respect, along with their fundamental human rights and humanity."

Levy used to support a two-state solution, but now feels it has become untenable, and supports a one-state solution.

Levy wrote that the 2008–2009 Gaza War did not achieve its objectives. "The conclusion is that Israel is a violent and dangerous country, devoid of all restraints and blatantly ignoring the resolutions of the United Nations Security Council, while not giving a hoot about international law", he wrote.

In 2010, Levy called Hamas a fundamentalist organization and held it responsible for the Qassam rockets fired at Israeli cities: "Hamas is to be blamed for launching the Qassams. This is unbearable. No sovereign state would have tolerated it. Israel had the right to react. But the first question you have to ask yourselves is why Hamas launched the missiles. Before criticising Hamas I would rather criticise my own government which carries a much bigger responsibility for the occupation and conditions in Gaza [...] And our behaviour was unacceptable."

Levy supports boycotting Israel, calling it "the Israeli patriot's final refuge". He has said that an economic boycott is more important but that he also supports academic and cultural boycotts.

During the Gaza war, Levy called for "lifting the criminal siege on the Gaza Strip".

== Reception ==
=== Praise ===
Levy's writing has won numerous awards, including the Emil Grunzweig Human Rights Award in 1996 from the Association for Civil Rights in Israel, the Anna Lindh Foundation Journalism Award in 2008 for an article he wrote about Palestinian children killed by Israeli forces, and the Peace Through Media Award in 2012. New York Times columnist Thomas Friedman has called him "a powerful liberal voice". In his review of Levy's book The Punishment of Gaza, journalist and literary critic Nicholas Lezard called Levy "an Israeli dedicated to saving his country's honour", but said "there is much of the story he leaves out". Le Monde and Der Spiegel have profiled Levy. Israeli journalist Ben-Dror Yemini wrote: "He has a global name. He may be [one of] the most famous and the most invited journalists in Israel".

In 2021, Levy was awarded Israel's top journalism award, the Sokolow Prize. In its citation, the prize committee wrote that Levy "presents original and independent positions that do not surrender to convention or social codes, and in doing so enriches the public discourse fearlessly."

=== Criticism ===
Levy has been criticised for being anti-Israeli and supporting the Palestinians. Amnon Dankner of the Maariv newspaper wrote, "Is it wrong to ask of reporters in a country that is in the midst of a difficult war to show a little more empathy for their people and their country?". Ben-Dror Yemini, the editor of Maariv's opinion page, called Levy a propagandist for Hamas. Itamar Marcus, director of Palestinian Media Watch, wrote, "[One of] the current Israeli heroes [of Hamas], from whom the Palestinians garner support for their ways, [is] Gideon Levy". In 2008, Arutz Sheva reported that Levy's article about the Jerusalem bulldozer attack was translated into Arabic for a Hamas website. In 2006, Gideon Ezra, Israel's former deputy Minister of Internal Security, suggested that the General Security Services should monitor Levy as a borderline security risk.

In 2002, Israeli novelist Irit Linur set off a wave of subscription cancellations to Haaretz when she wrote an open letter to the paper cancelling her own subscription. "It is a person's right to be a radical leftist, and publish a newspaper in accordance with his world view... However Haaretz has reached the point where its anti-Zionism has become stupid and evil", she wrote. She also accused Levy of amateurism because he does not speak Arabic.

Other public figures also canceled their subscriptions, including Roni Daniel, the military and security correspondent for Israeli Channel 2. Levy himself joked that there is a thick file of anti-Levy cancellations in the Haaretz newsroom.

In an open letter to Levy in 2009, Israeli author A. B. Yehoshua, formerly a supporter of Levy, called his comparison of Gazan and Israeli death tolls absurd and questioned his motives.

In 2013, Levy published an article about what he views as a disgraceful attitude towards African asylum seekers in Israel. He wrote, "This time the issue is not security, Israel's state religion. Nor are still talking about a flood of refugees, because the border with Egypt has been closed. So the only explanation for this disgraceful treatment lies in the national psyche. The migrants' color is the problem. A million immigrants from Russia, a third of them non-Jews, some of whom were also found to have a degree of alcohol and crime in their blood, were not a problem. Tens of thousands of Africans are the ultimate threat." Levy's remarks about Russians elicited accusations of racism from Eddie Zhensker, executive director of the Russian advocacy NGO Morashtenu, who accused Levy of "brute and coarse prejudices". Immigrant Absorption Minister Sofa Landver demanded that Levy be placed on trial. Levy later apologised to those who were offended, but said the real problem was that he had called Russian "immigrants" instead of "olim" and compared them to Africans.

During the 2014 Gaza war, the chairman of the Likud Yisrael Beiteinu faction in the Knesset, Yariv Levin, called for Levy to be put on trial for treason.

In February 2016, after Levy criticized the Israel Labor Party, its Secretary General, Yehiel Bar, wrote in Haaretz that Levy is a Trojan horse: "Sad, that Levy who used to be a moral compass, became a broken compass: at all time, with no connection to circumstances or reality, Levy's compass points negative, points despair, points irrelevant". Bar added that Levy regards Palestinians as uneducated children who are exempt from any responsibility for their actions.

== Personal life ==
Levy resides in Tel Aviv's Ramat Aviv neighborhood on a site that was, before 1948, part of the Palestinian Arab village of Sheikh Munis. He is a divorced father of two. He says his sons do not share his politics and do not read anything he writes. He has received death threats.

== Awards ==
- Emil Grunzweig Peace Award.
- 2003: Sparkasse Leipzig Prize Media Award
- 2007: Euro-Med Journalist Prize for Cultural Dialogue
- 5 May 2012: Peace Through Media Award at the eighth annual International Media Awards
- 7 January 2016: Olof Palme Prize, shared with Palestinian pastor Mitri Raheb, for their "fight against occupation and violence"
- 9 November 2021: Sokolov Award.

== Published works ==
- Twilight Zone – Life and Death under the Israeli Occupation. 1988–2003. Tel Aviv: Babel Press, 2004 ISBN 978-965-512-062-2, OCLC 646289069
- The Punishment of Gaza, Verso Books, 2010, ISBN 978-1-84467-601-9
- The Killing of Gaza: Reports on a Catastrophe, Verso Books, 2024, ISBN 978-1-80429-750-6
