= SS Frossoula =

Cargo steamship sunk in 1940

History
- Name: 1903: Hussar; 1915: Général Leman; 1926: Kilbane; 1938: Frossoula
- Namesake: 1903: Hussar; 1915 Gérard Leman
- Owner: 1903: Fisher, Renwick & Co; 1915: French Government; 1925: Louis Sicard; 1934: Cie de Nav Sicard; 1937: Cie Nouvelle de Nav Sicard; 1938: JE Vardavas & Co; 1940: Phoenix Steam Ship Co
- Operator: 1903: Manchester–London Steamers; 1940: Michael M Xylas
- Port of registry: 1903: (United Kingdom) Manchester; 1915: (France) Marseille; 1926: Casablanca; 1934: (France) Marseille; 1938: Panama
- Builder: Tyne Iron SB Co, Willington Quay
- Yard number: 144
- Launched: 27 May 1903
- Completed: June 1903
- Identification: 1903: UK official number 113122; 1903: code letters VCNF; 1917: code letters JKGW; 1921: code letters OIAC; 1927: code letters OWYF; 1934: call sign FOQR; 1938: call sign HPJP
- Fate: Sunk by German aircraft, 1940

General characteristics
- Type: cargo ship
- Tonnage: 1,255 GRT, 798 NRT
- Length: 220.0 ft (67.1 m)
- Beam: 33.0 ft (10.1 m)
- Depth: 14.8 ft (4.5 m)
- Decks: 1
- Installed power: 149 NHP
- Propulsion: 1 × triple-expansion engine; 1 × screw
- Speed: 10 knots (19 km/h)
- Notes: sister ships: Carbineer, Musketeer

SS Frossoula was a cargo steamship. She was built in England in 1903 as Hussar. She was renamed Général Leman in 1915, Kilbane in 1926, and Frossoula in 1938. She took Jewish refugees from Europe to the Levant in 1939. A German air attack sank her in the Battle of the Atlantic in 1940, causing the deaths of 33 of her crew. Only three people survived.

== Building and registration ==
The Tyne Iron Shipbuilding Company built the ship at Willington Quay on the River Tyne as yard number 144. She was launched on 27 May 1903 as Hussar for Fisher, Renwick and Company's Manchester–London Steamers, Ltd, and completed that June.

Hussar's registered length was 220.0 ft (67.1 m), her beam was 33.0 ft (10.1 m), and her depth was 14.8 ft (4.5 m). Her tonnages were 1,255 GRT and 798 NRT. She had a single screw, driven by a three-cylinder, 149-NHP triple-expansion engine built by the North East Marine Engine Company Ltd of Newcastle upon Tyne.

Fisher, Renwick registered Hussar at Manchester. Her UK official number was 113122 and her code letters were VCNF.

== Sister ships ==
The Tyne Iron Shipbuilding Co built two sister ships for Fisher, Renwick, to the same measurements as Hussar. Yard number 164 was built and launched in March 1907 as Carbineer. Yard number 168 was also built to the same measurements, and launched in December 1907 as Musketeer.

Carbineer had her engine room, boiler room, and main superstructure amidships. She had three holds: two forward of her superstructure, and one aft. She had one funnel and two masts, and was capable of 10 knots (19 km/h). Hussar and Musketeer are likely to have had the same layout, and to have been capable of a similar speed.

Carbineer and Musketeer had short careers. In April 1914 Carbineer sank as the result of a collision with a ship called Isis in the English Channel off Selsey Bill. In September 1916 Musketeer capsized and stranded in the Seine.

== Changes of owner, name, and identification ==
In 1915 the French Government bought Hussar and renamed her Général Leman, after the Belgian Gérard Leman who in August 1914 had commanded forts around Liége as they resisted the German 1st Army for 11 days. Leman was eventually captured, but hailed in Belgium and France as a hero. The ship Général Leman was registered in Marseille. By 1917 her code letters were JKGW. By 1921 she was equipped with wireless telegraphy, and her code letters had been changed to OIAC.

Sarner et Compagnie bought Général Leman in 1923, and sold her in 1925 to Louis Sicard. In 1926 Sicard renamed her Kilbane and registered her in Casablanca, and her code letters were changed to OWYF. In 1934 Sicard re-registered her in Marseille. Also by 1934, the call sign FOQR superseded her code letters.

In 1938 JE Vardavas and Company bought Kilbane, renamed her Frossoula, (Note: Several news reports from 1939 spell the name as "Frossula". However, Lloyd's Register uses Frossoula, so Frossula seems to be a mis-spelling.) and registered her under the Panamanian flag of convenience. Her call sign was changed to HPJP. In 1940 the Phoenix Steam Ship Company acquired Frossoula, and placed her under the management of Michael M Xylas.

== Jewish refugees ==
In May 1939 Frossoula was in Sulina in Romania, where she embarked 658 Czechoslovak Jewish refugees. They were reported to have paid $1,000 each for their passage. They included 194 women; 77 children; and more than 100 former members of the Czechoslovak Army, which had been disbanded after Germany occupied Bohemia and Moravia. Also among her refugees was Heinz (Zvi) Loewy, who became the father of Israeli journalist Gideon Levy.

Frossoula left Sulina on 29 May, and sailed via the Bosporus to the Mediterranean, and on 16 July she docked in Beirut. French authorities refused to let the refugees enter Lebanon or Syria. However, an epidemic had broken out aboard Frossoula in passage from Sulina. The French allowed the refugees to disembark temporarily to be disinfected, and then immediately re-embark. By 27 July Frossoula had left Beirut, but she remained off the Lebanese coast for more than a month.

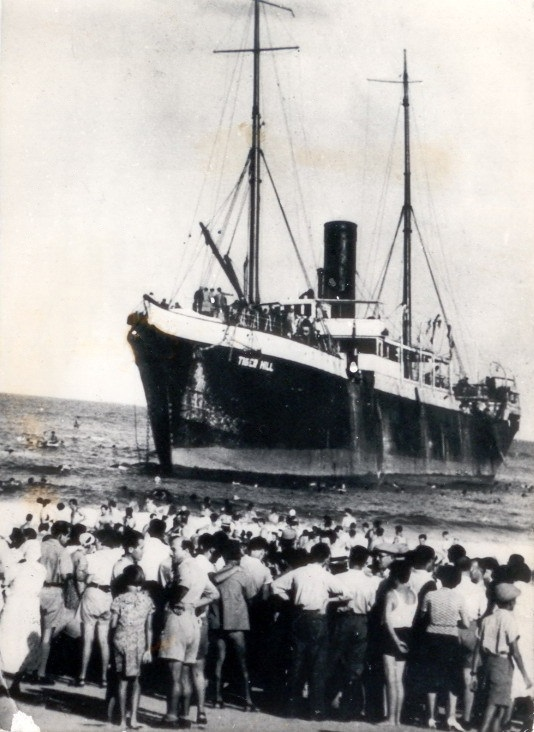
Tiger Hill beached at Tel Aviv on 1 September 1939

On 3 August another Panamanian-registered ship, Tiger Hill, left Constanța in Romania, carrying between 750 and 900 Jewish refugees. On 29 August she arrived off Beirut and rendezvoused at sea with Frossoula, whose refugees were transferred to Tiger Hill. Tiger Hill then steamed south to Palestine, where the Royal Navy and Royal Air Force tried to stop her from reaching land. However, her crew beached Tiger Hill at Tel Aviv, where her refugees then made their way ashore. The United Kingdom authorities detained most of the refugees for at least ten days. They were then released to the Jewish Agency.

The Czechoslovak soldiers may have disembarked from Frossoula in Beirut, rather than being transferred to Tiger Hill. On 31 August 1939 the Jewish Telegraphic Agency reported that French authorities had interned Czechoslovak 150 officers and 175 privates at Beirut. The JTA reported that the UK authorities were considering admitting them to Palestine, at first to be detained at the Sarafand internment camp, but then to be released into the armed forces. In October 1939 these troops would have become eligible to join the 1st Czechoslovak Infantry Division, which the Czechoslovak government-in-exile was creating in France. However, a group of 206 Czechoslovak soldiers was still in Beirut when France capitulated on 22 June 1940. From there they reached Palestine, where they formed the nucleus of a new Czechoslovak 11th Infantry Battalion.

== Loss ==
In July 1940 Frossoula left Barcelona in Spain for Glasgow in Scotland, carrying a cargo of potash. Panama was neutral at the time, but on 15 July German aircraft sank the ship in the North Atlantic by bombing her about 258 nautical miles (478 km) northwest of Cape Finisterre. 18 of her crew abandoned ship in two lifeboats: one commanded by her Master, and the other by her Chief Officer. There was a heavy sea; the Master's boat was never seen again; and all aboard her were lost. Aboard the Chief Officer's boat, some of the occupants were washed overboard, and others died of exposure. After four days, the Chief Officer's boat reached a British port. Only three survivors remained aboard the boat: the Chief Officer, the Second Engineer, and one seaman. Up to 33 members of her crew were lost.

== Bibliography ==
- Lloyd's Register of British and Foreign Shipping. Vol. I.–Steamers. London: Lloyd's Register of Shipping. 1904 – via Internet Archive.
- Lloyd's Register of Shipping. Vol. II.–Steamers. London: Lloyd's Register of Shipping. 1917 – via Internet Archive.
- Lloyd's Register of Shipping. Vol. II.–Steamers. London: Lloyd's Register of Shipping. 1921 – via Internet Archive.
- Lloyd's Register of Shipping. Vol. II.–Steamers. London: Lloyd's Register of Shipping. 1927 – via Internet Archive.
- Lloyd's Register of Shipping (PDF). Vol. II.–Steamers and Motorships of 300 tons gross and over. London: Lloyd's Register of Shipping. 1934 – via Southampton City Council.
- Lloyd's Register of Shipping (PDF). Vol. II.–Steamers and Motorships of 300 tons Gross Trawlers, Tugs, Dredgers, &c. London: Lloyd's Register of Shipping. 1939 – via Southampton City Council.
- Lloyd's Register of Shipping (PDF). Vol. II.–Steamers and Motorships of 300 tons Trawlers, Tugs, Dredgers, &c. London: Lloyd's Register of Shipping. 1940 – via Southampton City Council.
- Mercantile Navy List. London. 1904 – via Crew List Index Project.
