= Judeo-Malay =

Malayan language

- Yahudi-Melayu, יאהודי-מֱלאיו
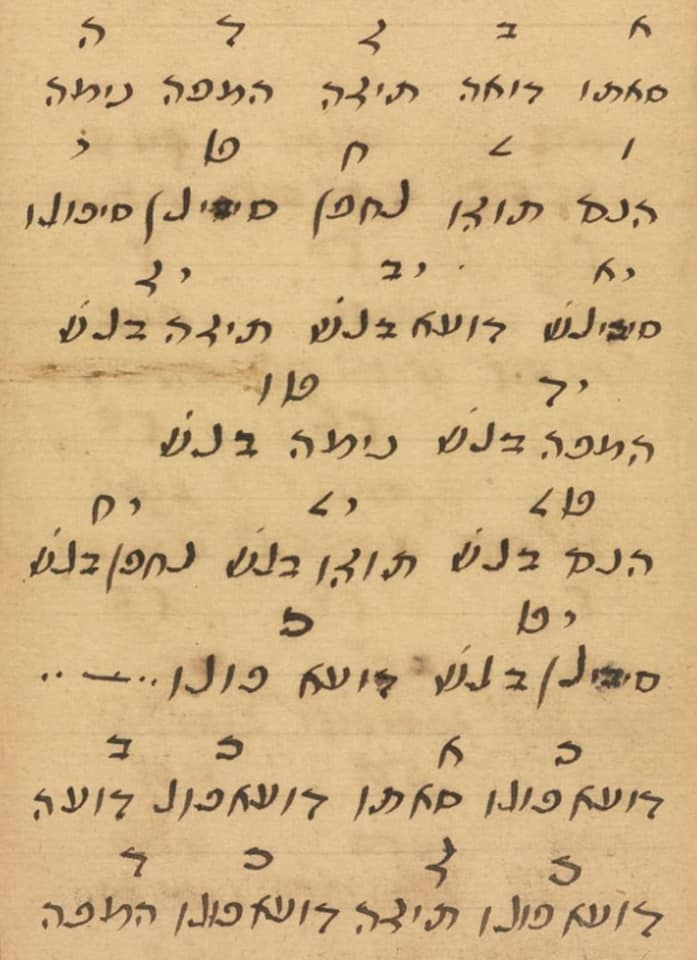
- A Judeo-Malay word list from circa 1900 from a notepad belonging to Rahamim Jacob Cohen.
- Native to: Malaysia
- Region: Penang
- Ethnicity: Malaysian Jews
- Extinct: (date missing)
- Language family: Austronesian: Malayo-Polynesian; (disputed); Malayic; Malay; Judeo-Malay
- Writing system: Hebrew

Language codes
- ISO 639-3: –
- Glottolog: None

Judeo-Malay (Malay: Bahasa Yahudi-Melayu, Jawi: بهاس يهودي-ملايو, Hebrew: מלאית-יהודית) is a variant of the Malay language once spoken or written by the Jews of Penang, a state located in northern Peninsular Malaysia. Judeo-Malay is the only known recorded Jewish language of the Austronesian family. The surviving manuscripts of Judeo-Malay are recorded on a notepad of an Iranian Jew by the name of Rahamim Jacob Cohen, which is currently kept in the Microfilms of Alalay Manuscripts from the British Library's Asia, Pacific and Africa Collections.

== Examples ==
A sample sentence in Judeo-Malay and Standard Malay for comparison:

- Judeo-Malay: Saiyah tidah maho lo, hampah batina hidob sana!
- Standard Malay: Saya tidak mahu kamu, empat perempuan/betina hidup disana!

(Translation: I don't want you, there are four women living there!)

Below are the numbers 1–6 in Judeo-Malay, transcribed from Cohen's notes, and in Standard Malay:

Numeral	Judeo-Malay	Standard Malay
1	satuh	satu
2	du'ah	dua
3	tigah	tiga
4	hampah	empat
5	nimah or limah	lima
6	henam	enam

== See also ==
- History of the Jews in Malaysia
- Baghdadi Jews
