= History of the Jews in Malaysia =

Malaysian Jews Yahudi Malaysia יהודים מלזיים
Total population
- approximately 100 (2008)

Regions with significant populations
- Kuala Lumpur, Malacca, Negeri Sembilan, Penang

Languages
- English, Malay (Judeo-Malay), Hebrew, Persian, Arabic, Portuguese, Malayalam

Religion
- Judaism

The history of the Jews in Malaysia dates back to the 1700s. Jews have lived in Malaysia either as immigrants or born in the country. The state of Penang was once home to a Jewish community, until the late 1970s, by which time most had emigrated. Growing racial and religious hostility in Malaysia as a result of the Israeli–Palestinian conflict has caused many Malaysian Jews to leave the country. The Malaysian Jewish community consists of Sephardic Jews who live discreetly amongst the Kristang people (Malacca-Portuguese), Mizrahi Jews (the majority of whom are Baghdadi Jews), Cochin Jews, and Ashkenazi Jews.

== History ==
Jews could be found well into the 18th century in the cosmopolitan bazaars of Malacca. Malacca was the first and largest Jewish settlement in Malaysian Jewish history. Due to persecution by the Portuguese Inquisition in the region, many of the Jews assimilated into the Kristang community during the period. The arrival of Baghdadi Jews in Penang probably occurred at the turn of the 19th century as the fledgling British-ruled entrepot grew and attracted Jewish trading families such as the Sassoons and Meyers from India. There was also significant emigration of Jews from the Ottoman province of Baghdad as a result of the persecutions of the governor, Dawud Pasha, whose rule lasted from 1817 to 1831.

The first Baghdadi Jew known by name to have settled in Penang was Ezekiel Aaron Manasseh, who emigrated from Baghdad in 1895. Menasseh claimed to have been the only practising Jew in Malaya for 30 years until after World War I, when a significant number of Baghdadi Jews began to settle in Malaya. Statistics from the same period showed a somewhat different picture:

General census of Jewish settlers in Penang (1881–1941)
Year	Males	Females	Boys	Girls	Total
1881	14	9	5	4	32
1891	47	64	14	30	155
1899	83	41	33	15	172
1901	16	17	8	4	45
1941	11	8	6	5	30

During the Japanese invasion of Malaya, the Penang Jewish community was evacuated to Singapore, and many were interned by the Japanese during the subsequent occupation of both Malaya and Singapore. After the war, a majority had emigrated to Singapore, Australia, Israel and the United States. By 1963, only 20 Penang Jewish families remained in the country.

Penang's only synagogue, located on 28, Nagore Road, was opened in 1929 but closed down in 1976 as the community could no longer fulfill the minyan, a quorum of ten or more adult Jews assembled for purposes of fulfilling a public religious obligation. In 2008, it was reported that approximately 100 Jewish refugees from Russia were residing in Malaysia. The original Penang Jewish community ceased to exist with the death of Mordecai (Mordy) David Mordecai on 15 July 2011. The rest of the Penang Jews have either embraced Christianity or else have emigrated to other countries, especially with the rise of anti-semitic sentiments related to anti-Israel policies in reaction to the conflict in Palestine pursued by the Malaysian government since the 1970s.

Yahudi Road (or Jew Road) in Penang, where the majority of the Penang Jewish population lived, has since been renamed Jalan Zainal Abidin, erasing another legacy of the Jewish presence in Malaysia. The only significant presence remaining is the Jewish cemetery and the old synagogue, previously occupied by a photo studio whose owner, aware of the building's historical significance, had undertaken to preserve the exterior.

Besides that, there are also a minority of former Kristang Christians who had rediscovered their Sephardic Jewish roots and returned to Judaism. This led to the establishment of the Kristang Community for Cultural Judaism (KCCJ) in 2010 which is no longer in operation due to political reasons.

In 2021, the book The Last Jews of Penang by Zayn Gregory with illustrations by Arif Rafhan was released by Matahari Books chronicling snapshots of Jewish life in George Town.

== Penang Jewish Cemetery ==
The Penang Jewish Cemetery, established in 1805, is believed to be the oldest single Jewish cemetery in the country. It forms a 38,087 square feet (3,538.4 m^{2}) cleaver-shaped plot of land situated alongside Jalan Zainal Abidin (formerly Yahudi Road), a small link road located between Burmah and Macalister Roads in George Town. The cemetery used to be a green lung, but much of the lawn has been cemented over.

The oldest Jewish tombstone is dated 9 July 1835 dedicated to a Mrs. Shoshan Levi and is believed to mark the grave of the English Jewish benefactress who donated the land where the current cemetery stands. Most of the graves take the form of a triangular vaulted-lid casket, resembling ossuaries commonly found in Israel. There are approximately 107 graves located in the cemetery, with the most recent tombstone dated 2011, incidentally the grave of the last ethnic Jew on the island. It is the only cemetery established solely for the once small and thriving Jewish community in Peninsular Malaysia, although there may be a few Jewish graves in other non-Jewish cemeteries.

The graves of the Cohens are located separately from the main group of graves on the north-eastern corner of the cemetery and it includes the grave of Eliaho Hayeem Victor Cohen, a Lieutenant with the 9th Jat Regiment of the British Indian Army killed in an accident on 10 October 1941. It is the only grave in the cemetery that is maintained by the Commonwealth War Graves Commission. The cemetery is still officially open for burials, and is itself managed by a board of trustees established in 1885.

== Notable Malaysian Jews ==
- David Marshall, first Chief Minister of Singapore and Singaporean Ambassador to France; although he spent much of his life in Singapore, he played a pivotal role in the Malayan independence talks
- Zayn Gregory, convert to Islam. American Jewish-born data analyst, academic for Universiti Malaysia Sarawak and television host, author of The Last Jews of Penang

== Gallery ==
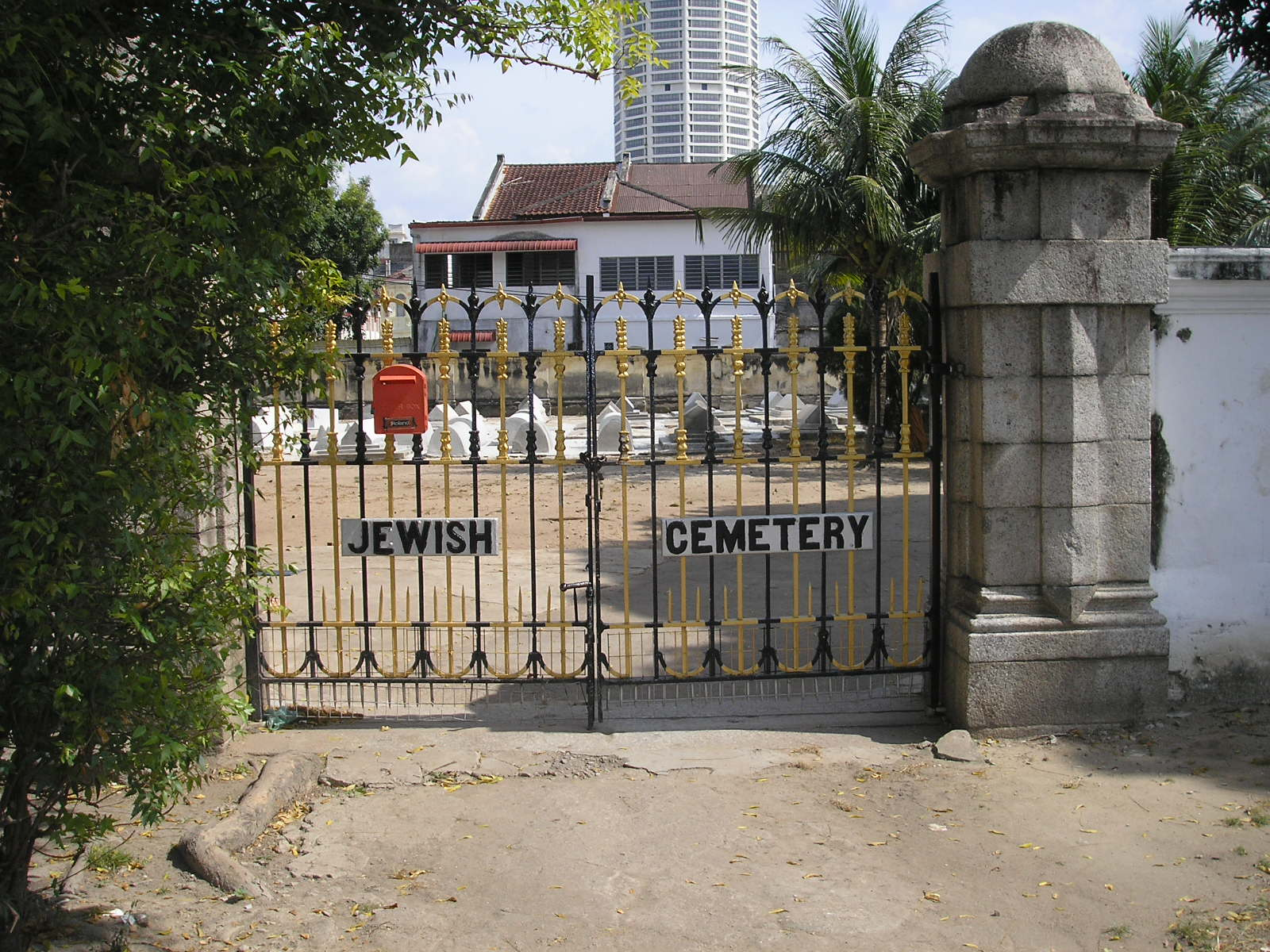
The entrance to the Penang Jewish Cemetery facing Jalan Zainal Abidin (formerly Yahudi Road)

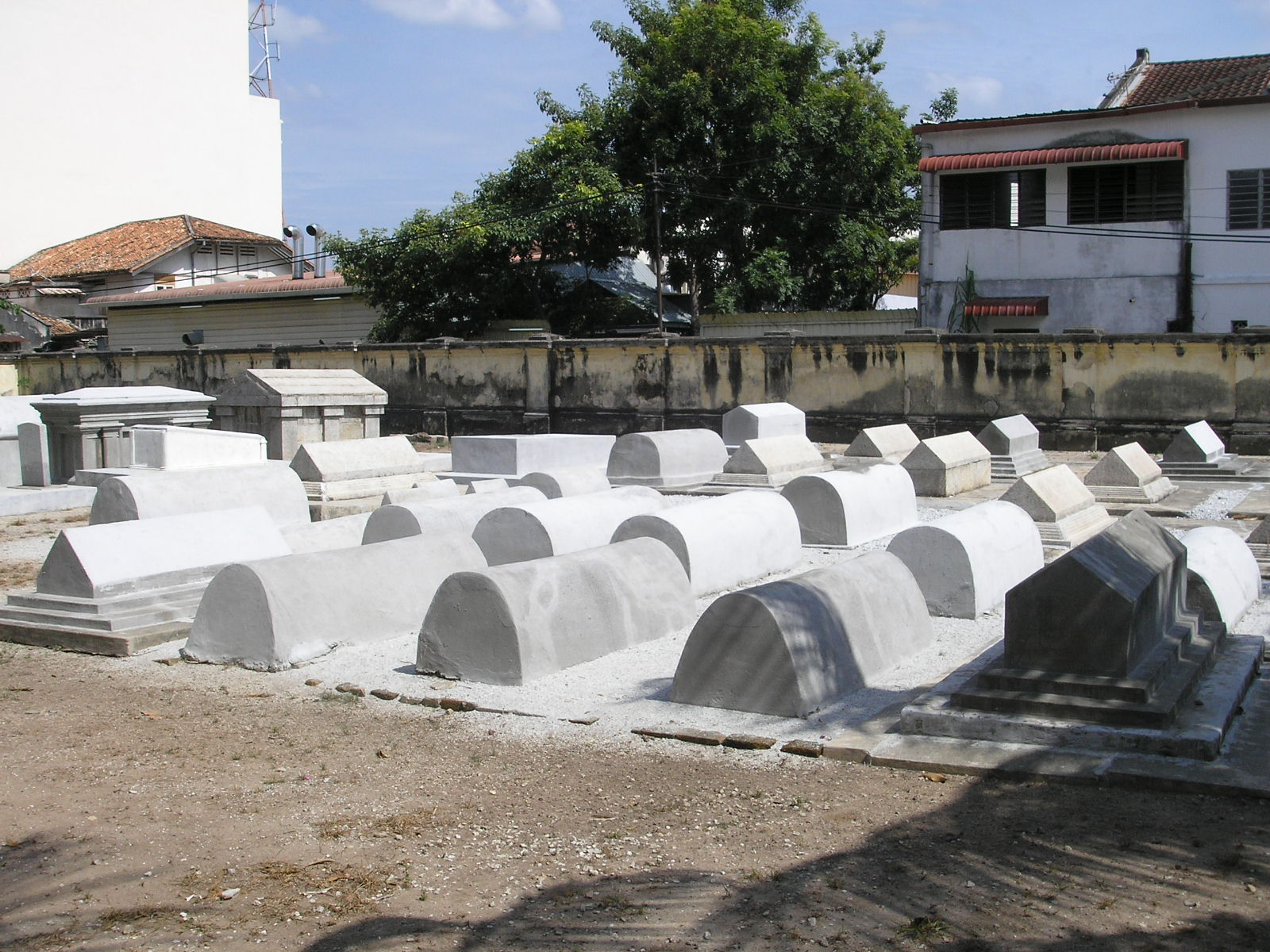
A view of the Penang Jewish Cemetery

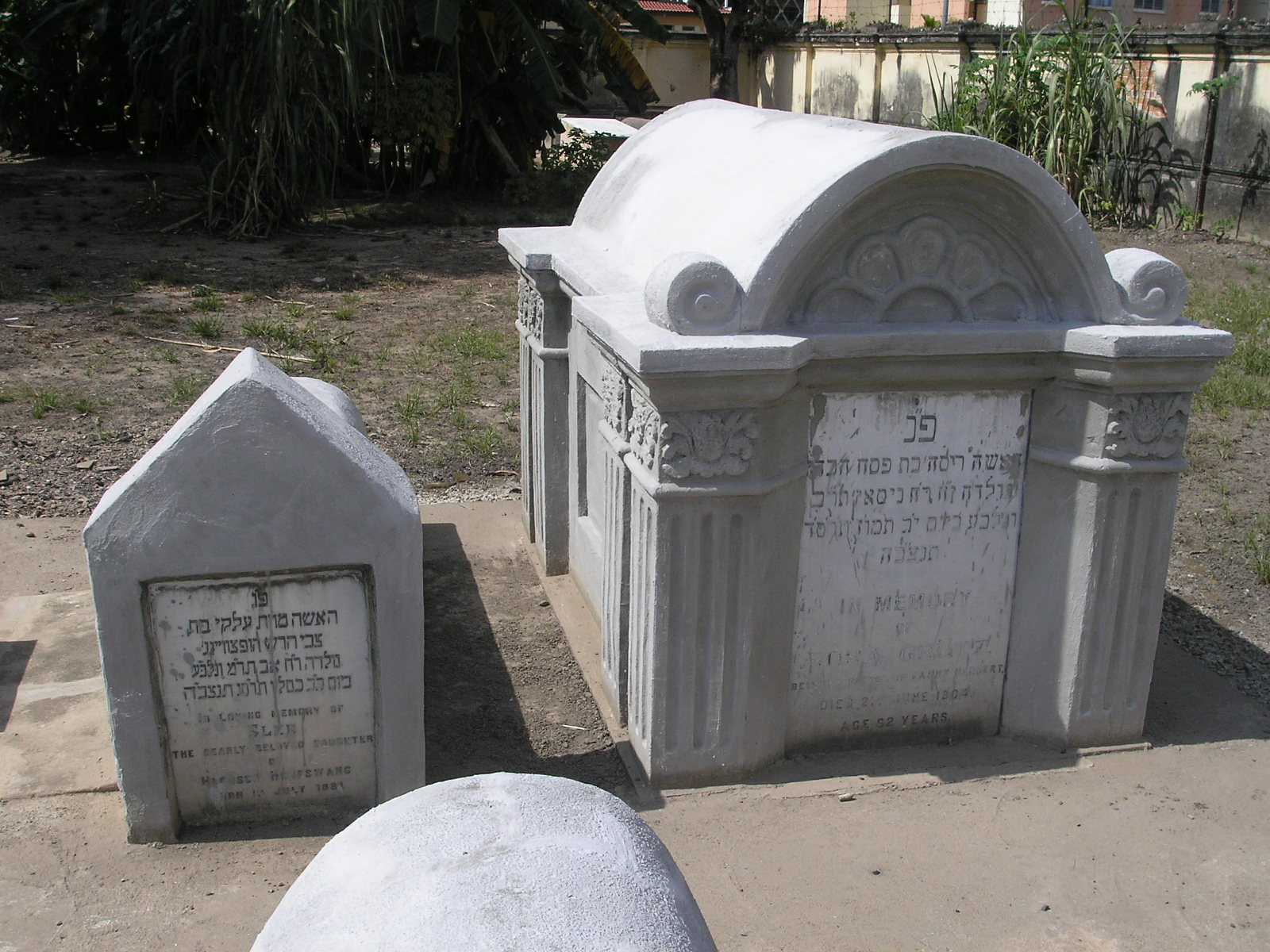
Tombstones at the Penang Jewish Cemetery

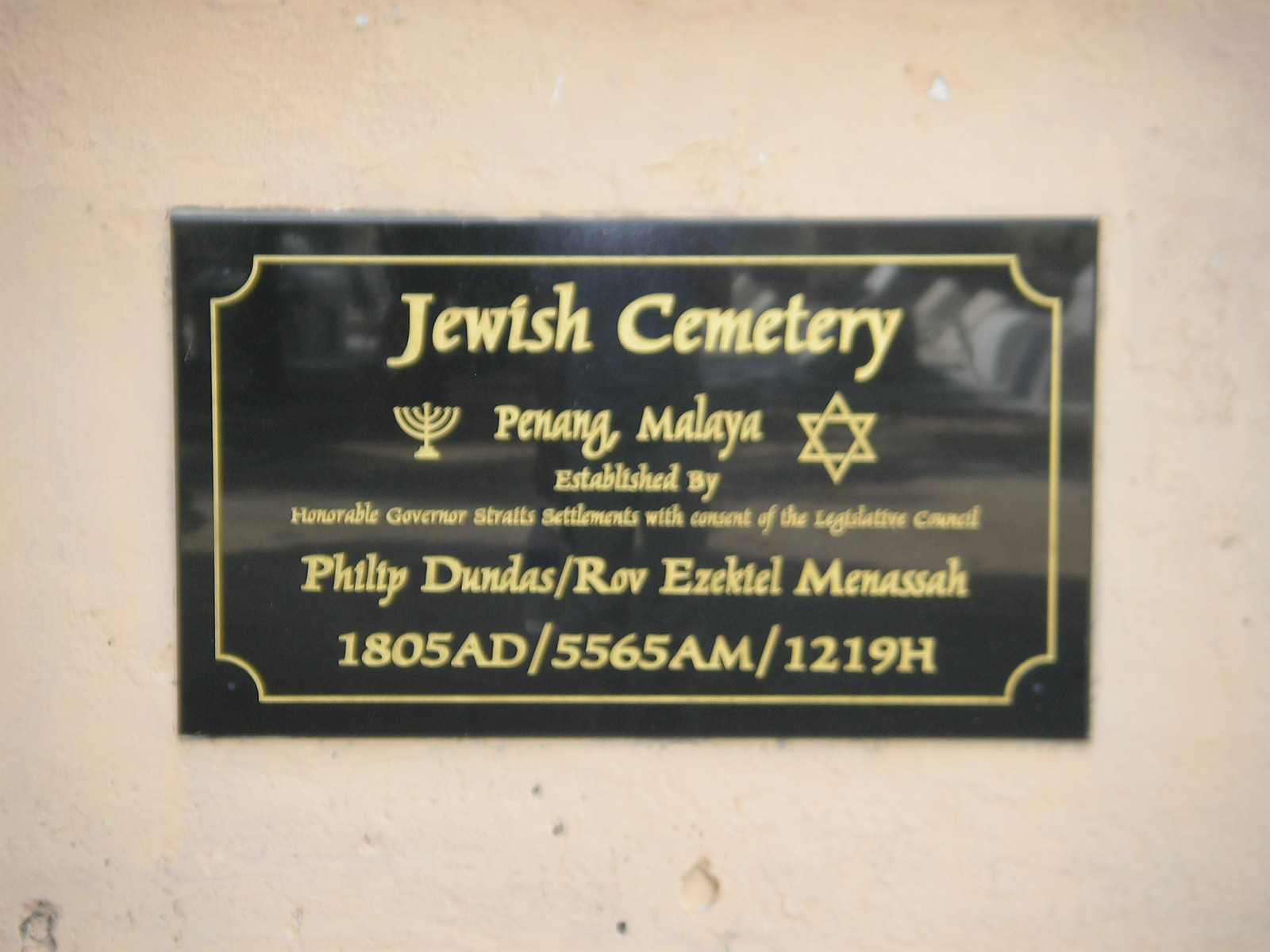
Commemorative plaque indicating the year of establishment of the Penang Jewish Cemetery

== See also ==
- History of the Jews in Singapore
- Baghdadi Jews
- Judeo-Malay

== Literature ==
- Khoo Salma Nasution. More Than Merchants: A History of the German-speaking Community in Penang, 1800s–1940s. Areca Books. (2006). ISBN 978-983-42834-1-4 (pg. 33)
