= Tiger Hill (ship) =

Steamship that carried Jewish refugees to Palestine

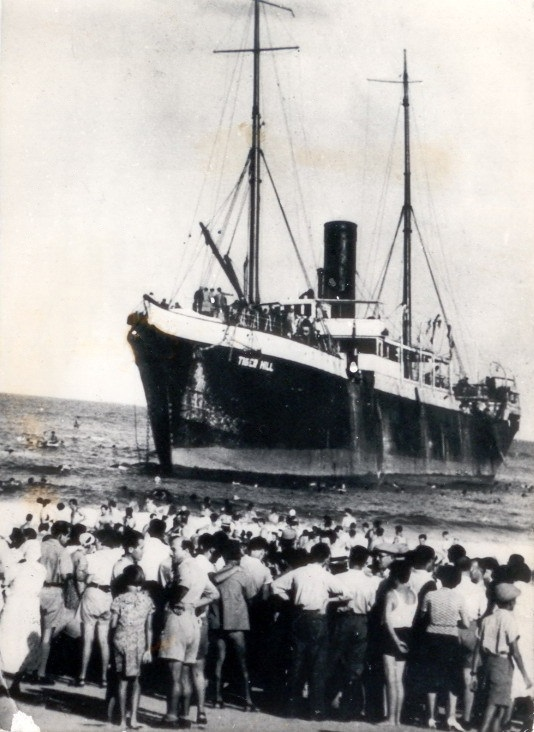
- Tiger Hill on Frishman Beach at Tel Aviv

History
- Name: 1887: Thrace; 1910: Thraki; 1916: Eustratios; 1930: Pilion; 1933: Cyprus; 1935: Kypros; 1938: Ellinico Ypethro; 1939: Tiger Hill
- Namesake: 1887: Thrace; 1910: Thrace; 1930: Pelion; 1933: Cyprus; 1935: Cyprus
- Owner: 1887: Panhellenic Steamship Co; 1916: Pandeli Brothers; 1930: Hellenic Coast Lines; 1938: Theo Papadimitrou; 1939: General Steamships Co Ltd
- Port of registry: 1887: (Greece) Piraeus; 1939: Panama
- Builder: A McMillan & Son, Dumbarton
- Yard number: 278
- Launched: 9 April 1887
- Identification: 1896: code letters HFPR; 1917: code letters HMJF; 1934: call sign SVDA; 1941: call sign HPMK
- Fate: Beached 1939; scrapped 1940

General characteristics
- Type: cargo and passenger ship
- Tonnage: 1,481 GRT, 881 NRT
- Length: 264.0 ft (80.5 m)
- Beam: 34.0 ft (10.4 m)
- Draught: 18 ft 11 in (5.8 m)
- Depth: 19.8 ft (6.0 m)
- Decks: 2
- Installed power: 235 NHP
- Propulsion: 1 × triple-expansion engine; 1 × screw
- Notes: sister ships: Ionia, Albania

Tiger Hill was a Greek-owned steamship that was launched in Scotland in 1887 as Thrace. In 1910 she was renamed Thraki, and from 1916 to 1939 she underwent several changes of owner and name.

In August 1939 Tiger Hill brought Jewish refugees from Europe to Palestine for Aliyah Bet. She was beached at Tel Aviv on 1 September; the day the Second World War began. In 1940 she was scrapped where she lay.

Thraki had been renamed Eustratios in 1916; Pilion in 1930; Cyprus in 1933; Kypros in 1935; and Ellinico Ypethro in 1938. Throughout those changes of owner and name she was registered the ship in Piraeus. In 1939 she was renamed Tiger Hill and transferred to the Panamanian flag of convenience.

== Building ==
In 1887 Archibald McMillan and Son of Dumbarton built three steel-hulled steamships for the Panhellenic Steamship Company. Yard number 277 was launched on 10 March as Ionia; yard number 278 was launched on 9 April as Thrace, and yard number 279 was launched on 18 May as Albania. The trio were sister ships, built to the same measurements and specifications.

Thrace's registered length was 264.0 ft (80.5 m), her beam was 34.0 ft (10.4 m), her depth was 19.8 ft (6.0 m), and her draught was 18 ft 11 in (5.8 m). She had two decks, and her tonnages were 1,481 GRT and 881 NRT. She had a single screw, driven by a three-cylinder, 285 NHP triple-expansion engine built by David Rowan & Co of Glasgow.

== Changes of owner, name, and identification ==
The Panhellenic Steamship Co registered Thrace in Piraeus. By 1896 her code letters were HFPR. In 1910 the company changed the registered spelling of her name from Thrace to Thraki. In 1916 Pandeli Brothers bought Thraki and renamed her Eustratios. By 1917 Eustratios' code letters were HMJF. By 1924 she was equipped with wireless telegraphy.

In 1930 Hellenic Coast Lines bought Eustratios and renamed her Pilion. In 1933 Hellenic Coast Lines renamed her Cyprus, and in 1935 the company changed the registered spelling to Kypros. By 1934 her call sign was SVDA, and this had superseded her code letters.

In 1938 Theo Papadimitriou bought Kypros and renamed her Ellinico Ypethro. In 1939 General Steamships Co Ltd bought Ellinico Ypethro, renamed her Tiger Hill, and registered her in Panama. Her call sign seems to have been changed to HPMK.

== Fate of sister ships ==
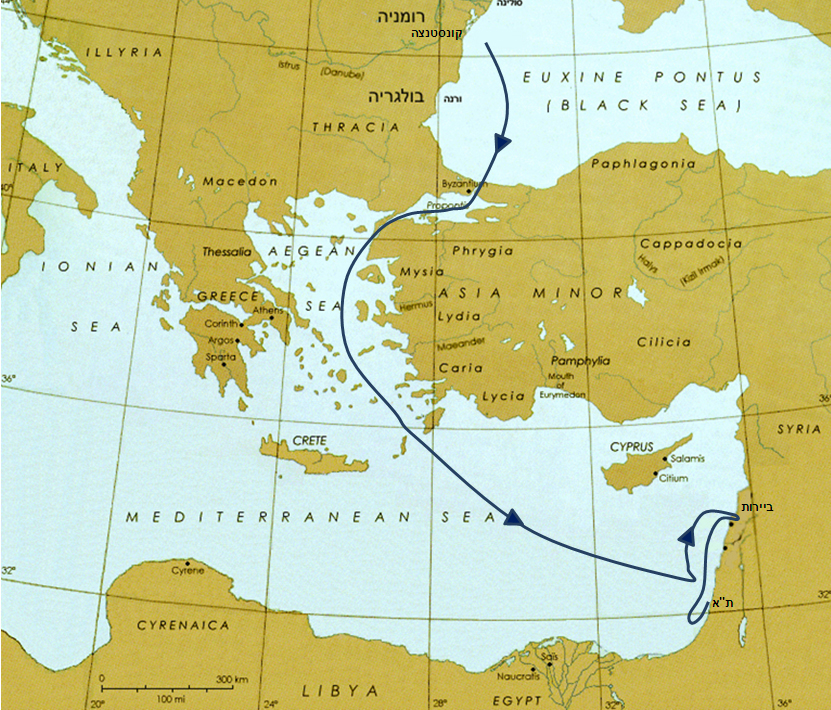
Tiger Hill's 1939 voyage from Constanța via Beirut to Tel Aviv

Pandeli Brothers, who bought Thraki in 1916 and renamed her Eustratios, bought Ionia at the same time and renamed her Katherina. In 1929 Apostolos Ringas bought Katherina and renamed her Lemnos. Hellenic Coast Lines, who bought Eustratios in 1930 and renamed her Pilion, bought Lemnos at the same time. Lemnos kept her name, and was scrapped in Italy in 1934.

In 1917 NG Kyriakides bought Albania and renamed her Alkimni. In 1937 she was scrapped. This left Kypros, formerly Thrace, as the last survivor of the three sister ships that McMillan and Son built in 1887.

== Tiger Hill ==
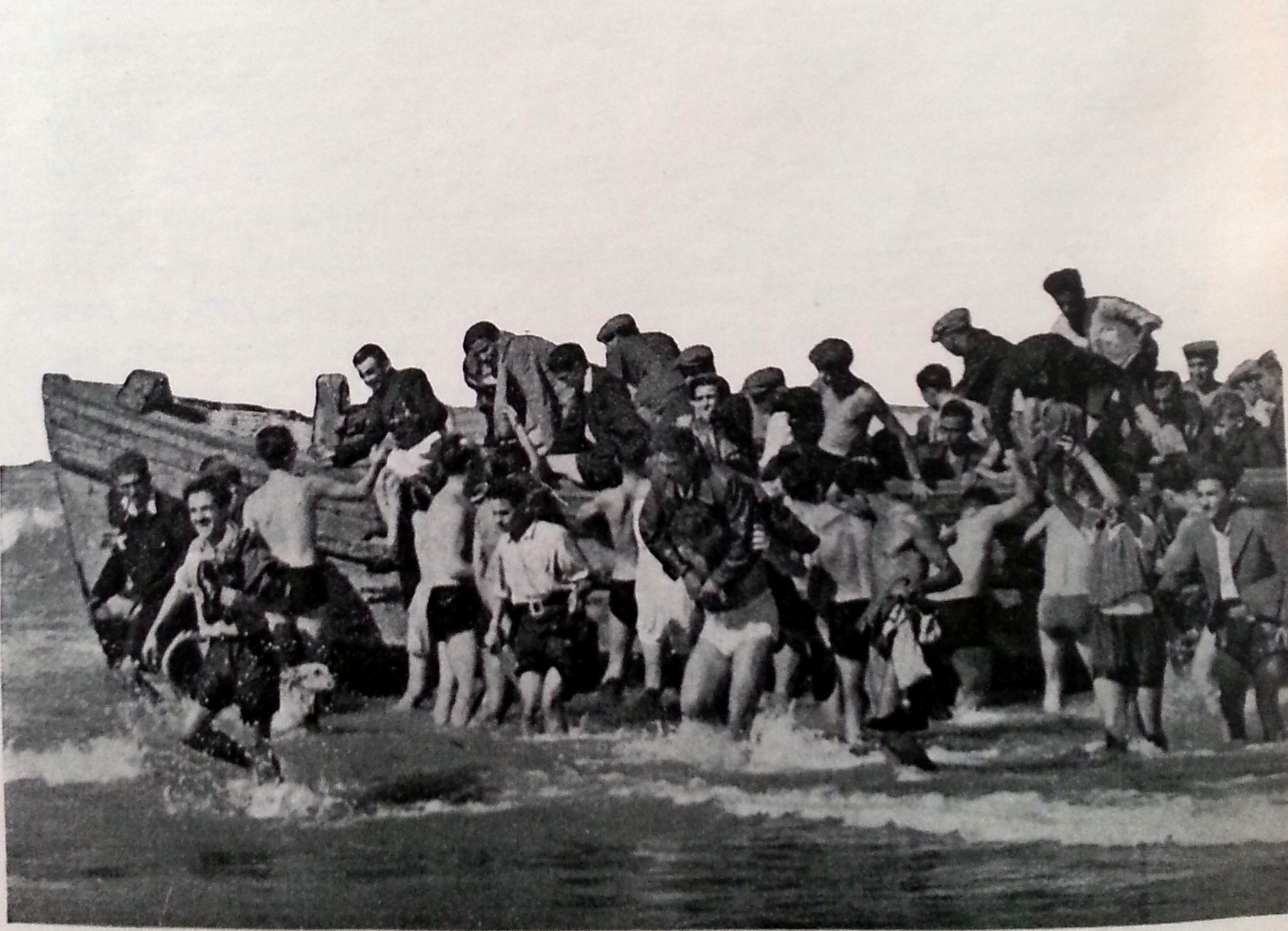
Refugees coming ashore at Frishman Beach in one of Tiger Hill's lifeboats

At the beginning of August 1939, Tiger Hill was in the Constanța in Romania. Hundreds of bunk beds had been installed in her holds to increase her passenger capacity. One source states that she embarked between 750 and 800 Jewish refugees who had come from Czechoslovakia, Austria, Germany, and Danzig. Another source states that she embarked more than 900 refugees, and that they were from Estonia, Poland, Romania, and Bulgaria. Each refugee was allowed to embark up to 25 kg (55 lb) of luggage. Tiger Hill left Constanța on 3 August, and sailed via the Bosporus to the Mediterranean.

Another Panamanian-registered ship, Frossoula, had left Sulina in Romania on 29 May carrying 658 Czechoslovak Jewish refugees. Frossoula had docked in Beirut on 16 July, but French authorities had refused to let the refugees enter Lebanon or Syria. By 27 July Frossoula had left Beirut, but she had remained off the Lebanese coast ever since.

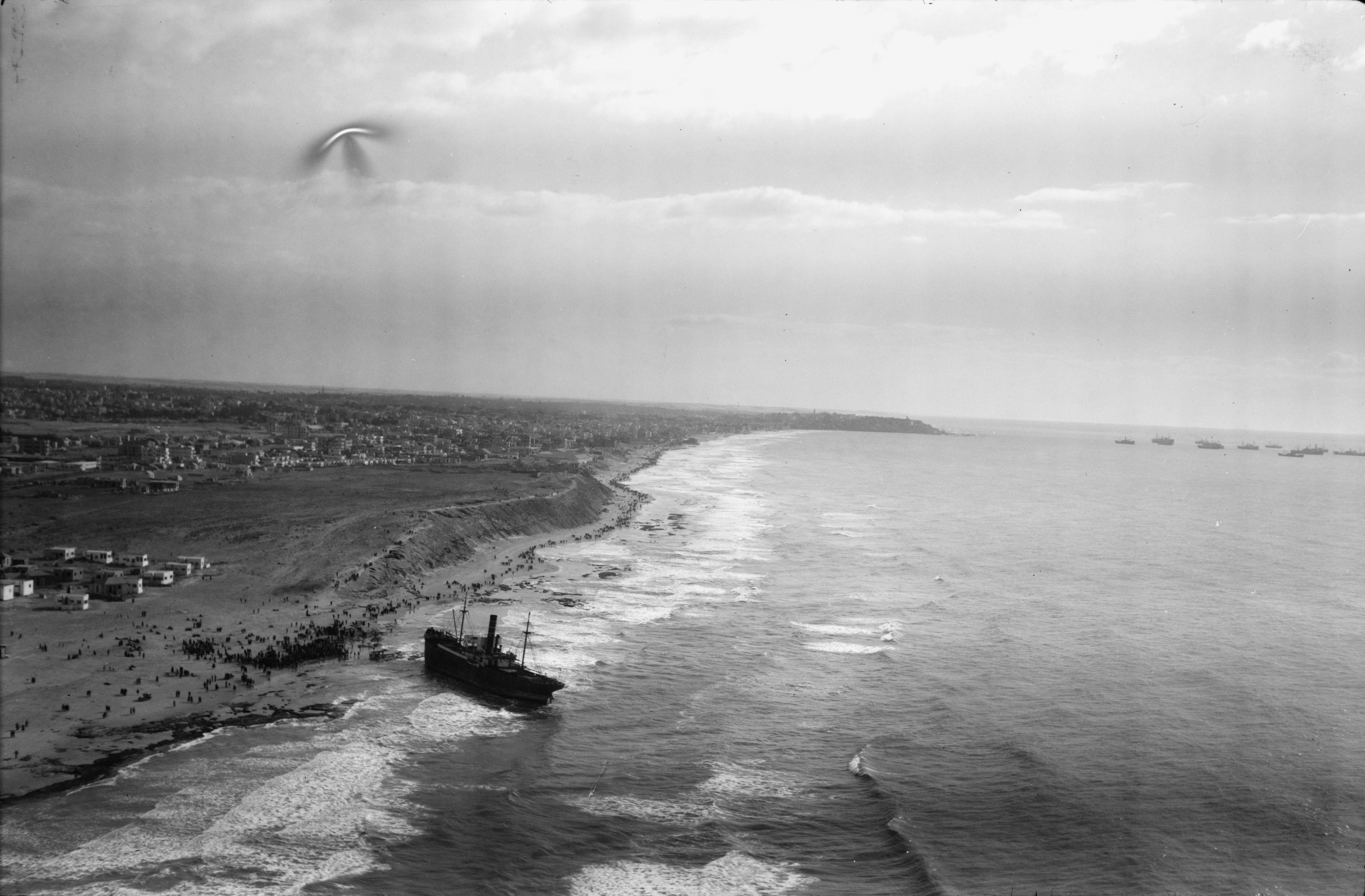
Aerial photograph showing the crowd gathered on Frishman Beach at Tel Aviv, and Tiger Hill beached in shallow water

On 29 August Tiger Hill arrived off Beirut and rendezvoused at sea with Frossoula, whose refugees were transferred to Tiger Hill. Tiger Hill then steamed south to the coast of Palestine. Under a policy ratified in May 1939, United Kingdom authorities were not allowing Jewish refugees to enter Palestine. On 1 September, Royal Navy gunboats and RAF aircraft opened fire on Tiger Hill off Tel Aviv. Two passengers were killed: Zvi Binder and Dr Robert Schneider.

A crowd of spectators gathered on Frishman beach in Tel Aviv, where Tiger Hill's Master ran her aground in shallow water. Her passengers made their way ashore, where the Palestine Police Force detained most of them for at least ten days. They were then released to the Jewish Agency. Estimates of the total number of refugees aboard Tiger Hill range from 1,100 to 1,500.

Tiger Hill was not refloated. She was scrapped in situ in 1940.

== Bibliography ==
- Lloyd's Register of British and Foreign Shipping. Vol. I.–Steamers. London: Lloyd's Register of Shipping. 1896 – via Internet Archive.
- Lloyd's Register of Shipping. Vol. II.–Steamers. London: Lloyd's Register of Shipping. 1917 – via Internet Archive.
- Lloyd's Register of Shipping. Vol. II.–Steamers and Motor Vessels. London: Lloyd's Register of Shipping. 1923 – via Internet Archive.
- Lloyd's Register of Shipping (PDF). Vol. II.–Steamers and Motorships of 300 tons gross and over. London: Lloyd's Register of Shipping. 1930 – via Southampton City Council.
- Lloyd's Register of Shipping (PDF). Vol. II.–Steamers and Motorships of 300 tons gross and over. London: Lloyd's Register of Shipping. 1933 – via Southampton City Council.
- Lloyd's Register of Shipping (PDF). Vol. II.–Steamers and Motorships of 300 tons gross and over. London: Lloyd's Register of Shipping. 1934 – via Southampton City Council.
- Lloyd's Register of Shipping (PDF). Vol. II.–Steamers and Motorships over 300 tons. London: Lloyd's Register of Shipping. 1935 – via Southampton City Council.
- Lloyd's Register of Shipping (PDF). Vol. II.–Steamers and Motorships of 300 tons Gross and Over. London: Lloyd's Register of Shipping. 1938 – via Southampton City Council.
- Lloyd's Register of Shipping (PDF). Vol. II.–Steamers and Motorships of 300 tons Trawlers, Tugs, Dredgers, &c. London: Lloyd's Register of Shipping. 1940 – via Southampton City Council.
- Lloyd's Register of Shipping (PDF). Vol. II.–Steamers and Motorships of 300 tons gross and over. London: Lloyd's Register of Shipping. 1941 – via Southampton City Council.
- Universal Register. London: Lloyd's Register of Shipping. 1888 – via Internet Archive.
