= Israel–Malaysia relations =

- Israel: Malaysia

Israel and Malaysia do not maintain formal diplomatic relations. Malaysia recognises Palestine as a sovereign state while not recognising Israel, and has stated that any steps toward recognition would be conditional on Israel's withdrawal from the occupied Palestinian territories and the establishment of a Palestinian state within the pre-1967 borders, with East Jerusalem as its capital, as part of a two-state solution.

Despite the lack of diplomatic ties and Malaysia's opposition to Israel's policies, limited commercial relations between the two countries have existed. Israeli passport holders are generally prohibited from entering Malaysia without written permission from the Malaysian Ministry of Home Affairs, and Malaysian passports contain a statement indicating that they are valid "for all countries except Israel". However, Israeli citizens who also hold another nationality may enter Malaysia using their non-Israeli passports.

== History ==
=== Federation of Malaya ===
The first political contact between Malaysia and Israel was made when Israeli foreign minister Moshe Sharett visited Kuala Lumpur in 1956, the year before the independence of the Federation of Malaya. He described the reception of his proposal to appoint an Israeli consul in Kuala Lumpur as "favourable without hesitation" on the part of his official host, Tunku Abdul Rahman (later the first prime minister of Malaysia).

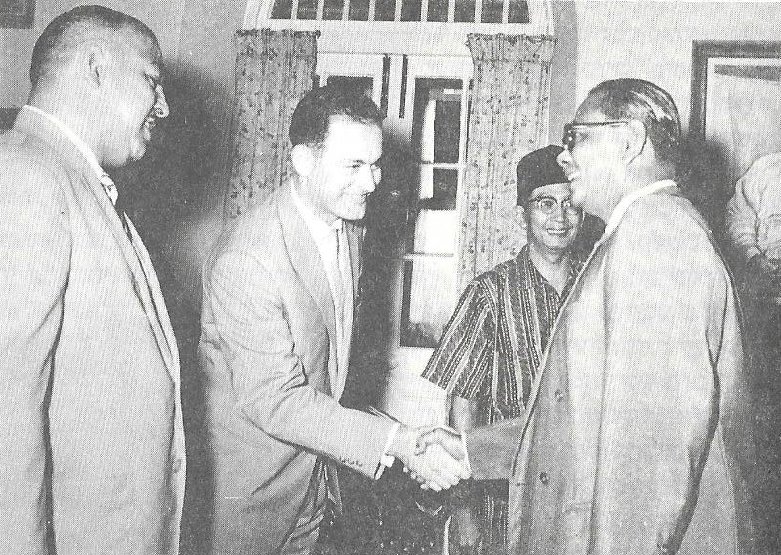
Moshe Yegar (left) shakes hands with Tunku Abdul Rahman in 1960.

On 26 August 1957, Israel's prime minister David Ben-Gurion sent a congratulatory letter to Tunku, telling him that Israel was ready to set up an "appropriate representation" in Kuala Lumpur. When Malaya's bid for membership in the United Nations came up in 1957, Israel voted in support of Malaya's acceptance. On 23 December 1957, a Malayan UN delegate told a member of the Israeli delegation that Malaya recognised Israel, but had no intention of establishing formal diplomatic ties, despite signs of mutual friendliness with fellow Israeli diplomats.

Later in November 1959, Tunku told an Israeli envoy that he could not establish any diplomatic ties with Israel due to staunch Muslim opposition. In 1961, Tunku also mentioned that he was pressured by Middle East countries, especially Egypt, not to develop diplomatic relationships with Israel.

=== Federation of Malaysia ===
The formation of modern Malaysia in 1963 resulted in strong opposition from Indonesia. Indonesia accused Malaysia of adopting neocolonialism with British support, leading to the Indonesia–Malaysia confrontation from 1963 to 1966. To improve its image, Malaysia decided to appeal to Middle Eastern Arab nations by branding itself as a Muslim country and condemning Israel. In March 1963, the Israeli company Astraco was permitted to open a branch in Kuala Lumpur, but rebranded as Interasia. The following year, the company moved its operations to Singapore due to commercial considerations. However, despite this, Israel sent an official from its foreign ministry to the company in order to maintain the only Israeli presence in Malaysia. Moshe Yegar was appointed for this mission from November 1964 as head of the Israeli commercial concern, but the real intention was to establish diplomatic ties with Malaysia. However, in January 1966, Moshe was quietly expelled from Kuala Lumpur due to domestic political pressure and foreign pressure from other Muslim countries.

By 1965, Malaysia had become increasingly isolated from Israel. It refused to grant any entry permits for Israel diplomats, and took part in anti-Israeli activities in the United Nations. On 23 August 1966, Tunku Abdul Rahman declared that Malaysia no longer recognised Israel in the Parliament of Malaysia, simultaneously criticising Singapore for employing Israeli advisors. In 1968, Israeli seamen were forbidden to disembark in Malaysian ports. By 1974, trade with Israel and granting of entry permits to Israeli citizens had been completely prohibited. At the same time, Malaysia expanded its diplomatic relationship, having gone from relations with only two Muslim countries in the Middle East in 1967, to having relations with all Middle Eastern countries, except Israel, by 1991. Despite the hostility, Malaysia occasionally showed some acknowledgement of Israel; in 1968, Abdul al-Rahman, Tunku's son and a businessman, visited Israel as a representative of a lumber company. In November 1969, Malaysian representatives of the Asian Sports Federation asked their Israeli colleagues to support Malaysia's bid to host the Asian Games in 1974.

=== The Mahathir era ===
On 27 January 1981, Malaysia's fourth prime minister Mahathir Mohamad urged Arab nations to recapture the Palestinian territories by force. In April 1984, Malaysia supported the resolution at the Organisation of Islamic Cooperation (OIC) to sever ties with any country that moved its ambassador to Jerusalem. At this time, Malaysia was also a supporter of the Palestine Liberation Organization (PLO), and in 1974, Malaysia had allowed the PLO to open an office in Kuala Lumpur. In August 1982, under Mahathir's reign, the office was given full diplomatic recognition, with Malaysia's foreign minister claiming that Israel should recognise the PLO before any Malaysian recognition of Israel could take place.

In August 1984, a performance by the New York Philharmonic was cancelled in Kuala Lumpur, since Malaysia demanded that works from the Swiss Jewish composer Ernest Bloch be removed from the programme. In 1983, Mahathir alleged that the Jews were trying to destabilise Malaysia through Jewish-controlled newspapers. In 1986, Mahathir also claimed that the Jews had not learned their lessons from two thousand years of exile and persecution by the Nazis, claiming that the Jews themselves had become persecutors; Mahathir also attacked the New York Times and The Wall Street Journal Asia as Zionist publications. The visit of Israeli President Chaim Herzog to Singapore in 1986 also sparked fierce criticism from Malaysia, with calls to cut off Singapore's water supply and burn the Singaporean flag. In 1992, Malaysia denied entry of a delegate from Israeli national airline El Al to attend an international flight conference held in Malaysia. In December of the same year, Malaysia denied the entry of an Israeli football player Ronny Rosenthal of Liverpool F.C.; the team cancelled its visit to Malaysia in protest. In March 1994, Malaysia prohibited the screening of the Steven Spielberg movie Schindler's List, because the movie was aimed at gaining support for Jews. However, after protests from the United States and Australia, Malaysia allowed the screening of the movie, but with the condition that seven scenes involving violence and sex be cut. However, Spielberg insisted that the movie be shown in its entirety or not at all, and eventually removed all his films from Malaysia.

The signing of the Oslo I Accord between Israel and the PLO in September 1993 led Mahathir to tone down his attacks against Israel. Mahathir even considered establishing diplomatic relations with Israel, but he stressed that Israel has to do more to bring peace to the Middle East and the Palestinian lands would be returned. Malaysia later pledged to help Gaza and Jericho rebuild infrastructure in response to the Israel-PLO agreement. However, in December 1993, Mahathir said that Malaysia was not ready yet to establish diplomatic relations with Israel because Israel has not recognized the state of Palestine. Mahathir also accused Zionists of undermining Malaysia's integrity and trying to destroy Islam. In July 1994, Tunku Abdullah, brother of the King of Malaysia paid a private visit to Israel. When his visit was made known in Malaysia, Mahathir denied any government knowledge or involvement in the visit. In 1994, a small number of Israelis were allowed to enter Malaysia to participate in a number of conferences touching various topics. In January 1996, Israeli finance minister Avraham Shochat said that Israel was looking forward to establishing diplomatic ties with Malaysia. However, the Malaysian foreign ministry replied that Malaysia was not in a hurry to establish such diplomatic ties.

During the 1997 Asian financial crisis, Mahathir asserted that George Soros was responsible for the financial crisis in the country for trading with the Malaysian ringgit. Mahathir also asserted the existence of an international Jewish conspiracy. When Malaysian deputy prime minister Anwar Ibrahim visited New York City, he said that Mahathir sincerely believed in the "international Jewish plot". Shortly thereafter, Mahathir fired Anwar for corruption and sexual offences. Mahathir's remarks sparked international criticism. However, Mahathir did not apologize. An official letter from Malaysia, not from Mahathir, said that Mahathir's remarks were incorrectly quoted in the media. While the World Jewish Congress praised the letter and considered the incident closed, Israel viewed it as an inadequate apology.

Mahathir had sent letters to Israeli prime ministers Yitzhak Rabin, Benjamin Netanyahu and Ehud Barak in the years 1993, 1997 and 1999, respectively. In 2012, the contents of these letters were made public to dispel allegations by radical Islamists that Mahathir's government had moved in the direction of recognizing the State of Israel.

=== 21st century ===
On 21 June 2003, Mahathir's political party, the United Malays National Organisation (UMNO) distributed The International Jew, an antisemitic book published by Henry Ford, during its general assembly. On 16 October 2003, two weeks before Mahathir stepped down from the post of prime minister, he delivered a speech saying that "the Jews rule the world".

In 2005, Malaysian Prime Minister Abdullah Ahmad Badawi criticised Israel, although less severely than his predecessor Mahathir. He accused Israel of perpetrating terrorism against Palestine. He also criticised Palestinian terrorism against Israel as impractical but not as immoral because the Palestinian people are fighting for self-determination. Generally, Israeli policymakers do not take particular interest in Malaysian affairs except during the Moshe Sharett era in 1956, the Golda Meir era in the 1960s, and the Yitzhak Rabin era in the 1990s. Otherwise, Israel would have taken countermeasures against Malaysia through the United States against Mahathir's pronouncements.

In August 2014, a Penang teenager who allegedly liked an "I love Israel" Facebook page was investigated under the Sedition Act by the South Seberang Perai police. He had sought police support after being threatened with immolation for liking the page, which he said happened by accident.

In February 2018, Malaysia allowed a delegation of Israeli diplomats led by David Roet to attend a conference hosted by the United Nations Human Settlements Programme. This was the first time since 1965 that an Israeli diplomat visited Malaysia. Malaysia, as a member of the United Nations, is required to grant visas to all delegates who attend UN-associated international conferences.

Mahathir became the prime minister of Malaysia for the second time in 2018. In January 2019, Mahathir compared Israel to his predecessor Najib Razak, who was facing criminal charges at the time for his involvement in the 1MDB scandal. During the World Leaders Forum at Columbia University in September 2019, Mahathir defended his antisemitic remarks in the context of freedom of speech. He has also said once that he was "glad to be labelled as anti-Semitic".

Malaysia criticized Israel's actions during the 2021 Israel–Palestine crisis, and together with Indonesia and Brunei urged the United Nations to end "the atrocities carried out against the Palestinian people". In June, Sagi Karni, Israel's ambassador to Singapore, said that Israel would be willing to establish diplomatic relations with southeast Asia's Muslim-majority countries, including Malaysia: "We are willing to talk, we are willing to meet, and the door is open as far as we are concerned. I don't think it's so difficult to find us."

In December 2023, during the Gaza war, Malaysian police announced they had arrested a man who made statements suggesting that Malaysia should establish diplomatic ties with Israel, and were investigating him under the Sedition Act. Later that month, Prime Minister Anwar Ibrahim cited violations of international law and declared that all Israeli-flagged ships would be barred from docking in Malaysian ports, and ships heading to Israel would be barred from loading cargo. Specifically mentioned was Israeli shipping company ZIM, which has had permission to dock in Malaysia since 2002. Anwar stated that the ban would not have a significant impact on Malaysian trade. At the time of the announcement, a ZIM-operated ship was scheduled to dock at Port Klang on 26 December. In a statement, Malaysian transport minister Anthony Loke said the ship would be prevented from docking.

In 2024, Anwar tweeted on X: "Malaysia mourns the loss of a fighter and defender of the Palestinian people, Al Syahid Yahya Sinwar, who was brutally murdered by the barbaric Zionist regime. Once again, the international community failed to fight and ensure that peace and justice were upheld, thus worsening the conflict situation. Malaysia strongly condemned the killing, and it was clear that the regime's attempt to undermine the demand for release would not succeed. As a result, Malaysia insists that Israel's barbarity be contradicted by the international community and that the ongoing massacre of Palestinians must be stopped immediately."

In October 2026, Malaysia banned civil servants from using Waze, a navigation app based in Israel that is owned by Google. Anwar said the decision was made "to protect government information and users' personal data from the threat of misuse by the Israeli regime", and recommended that users switch to TuJu, a Malaysian navigation app, as an alternative. Anwar later said a complete ban of the app is being considered.

=== Alleged Israeli undercover operations ===
During the 2021 Israel–Palestine crisis, former terror finance analyst at the US Treasury Jonathan Schanzer posted a tweet that alleged the IDF wanted to target all Hamas operatives around the world, including Malaysia. The Malaysian home ministry said that the police forces were strengthening security to maintain public order.

There have been at least three alleged operations by Israeli intelligence services targeting Palestinians residing in Malaysia. In April 2018, Palestinian engineer, lecturer, and Hamas member Fadi Mohammad al-Batsh was gunned down by two men on a motorbike while heading to a mosque for dawn prayers. Malaysian authorities suspected the assailants to be foreign agents. Hamas subsequently identified al-Batsh as one of their members, while his relatives blamed Israel for assassinating al-Batsh. Israel has denied involvement in al-Batsh's assassination.

In late September 2022, the Royal Malaysian Police foiled an alleged Mossad plot to kidnap two Palestinian computer experts in Kuala Lumpur using an undercover cell consisting of Malaysian nationals who had allegedly been recruited and trained in Europe. According to Malaysian authorities, this cell was also allegedly involved in spying on important sites, including airports, government electronic companies, and tracking down Palestinian activists. Though these operatives kidnapped one of the men, the second escaped and alerted Malaysian police. The operatives allegedly assisted Mossad officials via video call in interrogating their captive, who was questioned about the computer programming and software capabilities of Hamas and its al-Qassam Brigades. With the aid of the second Palestinian man, Malaysian police were able to track down the car registration plates to a house where the alleged kidnappers were arrested and the man was freed. Eleven Malaysians, including a woman, were later charged for the attempted kidnapping.

In March 2024, Malaysian authorities announced the arrest of a 36-year-old man, Shalom Avitan, at a hotel in Kuala Lumpur. Authorities said that he had entered Malaysia through Kuala Lumpur International Airport from the United Arab Emirates on a French passport. He was found to be carrying an Israeli passport, as well as several firearms and live ammunition. Investigators alleged that Avitan had arranged the purchase of the weapons after arriving in Malaysia and paid for them using cryptocurrency. Avitan, who was reportedly linked to the Musli brothers crime family, told investigators that his intended target was another Israeli citizen residing in Malaysia due to a family dispute. Officials expressed doubts about his account and said they were investigating whether he had links to Israeli intelligence services.

Amid the Gaza war and Malaysia's public support for the Palestinian cause, the government increased security measures for prominent figures in the country. Three other suspects, including a married couple, were arrested in connection with the alleged supply of banned firearms to Avitan. On 26 February 2025, Avitan was convicted and sentenced to seven years in prison.

== Commercial relations ==
In 1971, Malaysian imports from Israel exceeded M$11 million while exports to Israel totalled more than M$2 million. Malaysia then imposed a ban on trade with Israel in 1974. According to the Israel–Asia Centre, trade between Israel and Malaysia is conducted through intermediary countries such as Singapore and Thailand rather than directly, due to fear of outcry by anti-Israel groups.

As negotiations between Israel and the Palestinians gained momentum in 1993, Chua Jui Meng, then Deputy Minister of International Trade and Industry, suggested in 1994 that Israel's market could eventually become a destination for Malaysian investments. On 17 September 1994, Malaysian customs seized 24,000 tons of fertilizer, which was suspected to have originated from Israel. Malaysian authorities also suspected that there was a counter-boycott movement by Israeli businessmen in various countries. However, in mid-January 1996, the Malaysian Minister of International Trade and Industry was exploring the possibilities of establishing commercial relations with Israel. He said that such a relation would not have any political significance. In response to this, several Malaysian businessmen went to Israel from February to May 1996 to explore business opportunities in Israel, although the Malaysian boycott of Israeli products still stood. In October 1996, Malaysian bank Public Bank Berhad enabled a direct transaction relationship with Israel's Bank Hapoalim. The Malaysian Deputy Finance Minister also mentioned that Israeli businessmen were allowed to invest in Malaysia.

Between 2000 and 2001, exports to Malaysia from Israel's Intel computer chip factory in Kiryat Gat were responsible for US$600–700 million. As of 2019, the trade benefits reached US$10–11 billion.

A 2002 report on Israel's trade relations with Indonesia and Malaysia from Israel's Ministry of Industry, Trade and Labour advised Israelis interested in conducting business with Malaysian companies that "there is no opposition to trade and commercial relations as long as a low profile is kept." The same report stated that Israel's Intel factory accounted for some 98% of Israel's exports to Malaysia between 1999 and 2002. Thus in 1999, Israeli exports to Malaysia were worth $107 million – $5.3 million excluding Intel. That year, Israeli imports from Malaysia were worth $23.6 million. In 2000, Israeli exports to Malaysia were worth $732 million—$4.7 million excluding Intel. Israeli imports from Malaysia were worth $25.9 million. In 2001, Israeli exports to Malaysia were worth $615.5 million—$4.7 million excluding Intel. Israeli exports from Malaysia were worth $26.3 million.

Figures released by Israel's Central Bureau of Statistics showed that trade between Israel and Malaysia in 2008–2011 fluctuated considerably. In 2008, Israeli exports to Malaysia came to $30.2 million while Israel imported goods worth $100.6 million. In 2009, Israel exported $116.8 million worth of goods to Malaysia and imported goods worth $68.5 million. In 2010, Israel's exports to Malaysia grew to $798 million and imports grew to $85 million. 2011 saw Israel export goods to Malaysia worth $716.4 million and import goods worth $93.6 million. A report compiled by the European Commission indicated that in 2010, Malaysia ranked 15th among Israel's major trade partners, accounting for 0.8% (€667.6 million) of Israel's trade in that year. For Malaysia, trade with Israel is included in the "other countries" section.

Since 2014, Malaysian non-governmental organisation (NGOs) such as Boycott, Divestment and Sanctions (BDS) Malaysia, AMAN Palestine, Aqsa Syarif, Persatuan Pengguna Islam Malaysia and Viva Palestina Malaysia have called for a boycott of Israel-linked companies and Israeli products when Gaza-Israel conflict heightens. On 2 August 2014, Save the Children of Gaza was held by Viva Palestina Malaysia and Aqsa Syariff where 15,000 supporters gathered to show solidarity towards the Gaza people. Among the products boycotted are Victoria's Secret, Starbucks, McDonald's, Nestle, Coca-Cola, Kotex, and Marks and Spencer. A study conducted in 2017 showed that Muslim counterparts are more likely to join the boycott effort when compared to non-Muslims, although there are some of them who expressed doubt on the effectiveness of the boycott in hampering Israel's economy. The boycott movements also lack organisation.

== Sports ==
Israel-Malaysia sports relations have often mirrored broader diplomatic tensions. In 1967, two Israeli footballers, Giora Spiegel and Shmuel Rosenthal, participated in a regional tour in Malaysia as part of the Asian All-Stars team. Their participation represented one of the few instances of Israeli athletes competing in the country. The event was described as a "symbolic and exciting encounter", with Malaysian spectators responding enthusiastically to their arrival. Rosenthal noted the warm reception, stating, "The 10,000 spectators cheered us for long minutes."

Malaysia's posture toward Israel's place in the Asian Football Confederation (AFC) was initially relatively friendly, but it evolved over the course of the 1970s. At the AFC Congress in 1972, Kuwait submitted a proposal to expel Israel from the Confederation. Tunku Abdul Rahman—Malaysia's former Prime Minister and the then President of the AFC—responded by insisting that Israel's membership should be maintained:

"The Israelis are Asian and I would not support any attempt to expel them from the Confederation. We must have them stay. Israel is one of the forces that are guiding and advancing Asian football. I am happy to see them winning tournaments, despite the fact that my country is among those losing to them. Israel is among us and it will stay so … I represent a Muslim state but I will not support discrimination; I urge you to support the abolition of discrimination."

The Kuwaiti proposal was defeated, receiving only six votes in favour and twelve against, including Malaysia's.

In 1974, Kuwait again proposed Israel's expulsion at the AFC Congress. This time the motion passed (17–13) with six abstentions. Importantly, however, Malaysia did not support the expulsion: Tunku, casting Malaysia's vote, voted against the proposal.

The final removal of Israeli football from Asia followed at the AFC Congress in Kuala Lumpur in 1976. Kuwait proposed Israel's formal expulsion, and because all 21 states represented voted yes, Israel was expelled under a new clause adopted in the AFC constitution. In this context, although Malaysia—shaped by its own domestic and geopolitical considerations—did not object to the Kuwaiti proposal in 1976, Tunku appeared not to have been fully pleased with the outcome. At an extraordinary session in Hong Kong on 11 December 1977, the AFC reconfirmed its decision to expel Israel and Taiwan.

In 1992, when Malaysia refused to issue an entry permit to Ronny Rosenthal of Liverpool F.C., the team cancelled their visit.

In March 1997, Malaysian Prime Minister Mahathir Mohamad allowed Israel's cricket team to participate in the International Cricket Council tournament in Malaysia. This was the first official visit of Israel's sports delegation to Malaysia. The entry sparked street demonstrations in Malaysia. To calm down the protesters, Malaysia's Foreign Minister clarified that Malaysia has no intention to establish diplomatic ties with Israel until Israel has honoured all its obligations in the treaty signed together with the Palestinians.

In February 2000, two Israeli teams took part in a table tennis tournament in Malaysia. The opposition Muslim political party, the Malaysian Islamic Party (PAS) warned the government of "undesirable consequences" and claimed that Israel is an "illegal country". However, the Malaysian Minister of Sports said that Malaysia should not discriminate against any country if it were to hold international sports competitions. He maintained that Malaysia still holds the same view that Israel is the oppressor against Palestine.

In 2010, Israeli boxer Ilya Grad received special permission from the country's Muslim authorities to participate in a national TV reality show on boxing. Grad is a former Israeli Muay Thai champion, the 2010 Asia champion and the second runner-up in the world championship. Grad was allowed to enter the country and received a special visa.

In 2011, Chelsea F.C. visited the country for a friendly match against a Malaysian All-Stars team. A Chelsea player, Yossi Benayoun, faced "antisemitic abuse" from sections of the crowd. Chelsea FC lodged a complaint, condemning the behavior as "offensive, totally unacceptable and [having] no place in football". The Football Association of Malaysia (FAM) later apologized, stating, "If such an incident did happen, we would like to apologize to the player...and also to Chelsea."

On 26 December 2015, the Malaysian government refused to issue visas to two Israeli windsurfers and their coach to compete at the Youth Sailing World Championships in Langkawi in early 2016, citing its policy of not having diplomatic relations with Israel. This action was criticised by both the Israel Sailing Association and the World Sailing body. On 2 January 2016, it was reported that the Malaysian government had also declined to issue visas to the Israeli table tennis team to compete at the World Table Tennis Championships held in Kuala Lumpur in February 2016. The world governing body for the sport of sailing (created in Paris in 1906), ISAF Sailing World Championships executive decided that "all competitors from all countries" will be able to compete freely and equitably, otherwise there will be prohibitions held against countries which do not allow eligible participants to compete equally.

In early January 2019, the Malaysian government barred the Israeli Paralympics swimming team from participating in the 2019 World Para Swimming Championships scheduled to be held in Kuching, Sarawak, from 29 July to 4 August. On 14 January, Prime Minister Mahathir reaffirmed the Malaysian government's decision to deny the Israeli team visas, citing the lack of diplomatic relations between the two countries and the ban on Israeli passport holders from entering Malaysia. On 27 January 2019, the International Paralympic Committee (IPC) stripped Malaysia of the right to host the 2019 World Para Swimming Championships. Andrew Parsons of the IPC justified the body's decision on the grounds that "politics and sports are never a good mix".

In 2021, the World Squash Federation cancelled the Men's World Team Squash Championship after Malaysia banned the Israeli team from playing in the country.

== Education ==
In 1965, five Malaysians took part in courses at the Afro-Asian Institute in Israel. By 1966, no more Malaysians were sent to Israel for studies.

In March 1996, Mahathir allowed a group of 14 Israeli high school students to visit Malaysian schools, who met with the education minister and other senior public officials of Malaysia. This event did not spark any public interest.

In 1998, a Malaysian took a community development course in Israel for the first time since 1965.

== Travel ==
On 24 October 1994, Malaysia permitted Malaysian Muslims to visit Jerusalem by entering through Jordan, with the condition that they refrain from visiting other parts of Israel. Additionally, the pilgrims were not allowed to stay in Israel for more than two weeks. Following this announcement, Christian groups in Malaysia requested similar arrangements for visiting Israel. Their request was approved on 10 November 1994. Subsequently, the Malaysian Travel Association coordinated with the Israeli embassy in Singapore regarding Malaysian tourism to Israel. In 1995, Malaysian travel agents visited Israel. Later that year, Israel's national airline, El Al, signed an air-traffic agreement with Malaysia Airlines. In May 1995, a Malaysian television crew visited Israel. On 18 June 1995, the program was broadcast on Malaysian television, featuring an interview with an Israeli mayor, Ehud Olmert, accompanied by Israeli songs playing in the background.

In 2009, the government imposed a ban on visits to Israel, citing heightened security risks associated with the Israeli–Palestinian conflict. The ban was lifted in 2011, albeit with restrictions such as a quota of 700 pilgrims per year, a limit of no more than 40 pilgrims per church group, and a minimum age requirement of 18. Additionally, pilgrims were restricted to visiting Israel no more than once every three years, with each stay capped at a maximum of 10 days. In October 2012, the Malaysian government lifted the quota on pilgrimage tourism to Israel and extended the maximum stay duration from 10 to 21 days.

Israeli citizens are generally prohibited from entering Malaysia. However, in August 2013, Israeli journalist Gideon Levy travelled to Malaysia with Palestinian minister Hind Khoury and was granted entry by Malaysian authorities; Levy had been invited to Malaysia by Mahathir Mohamad. In October 2022, Nuseir Yassin, popularly known as Nas Daily, entered Malaysia legally using his Saint Kitts and Nevis passport. The Malaysian Immigration Director-General confirmed that Yassin, who holds dual citizenship, adhered to Malaysian immigration laws. In 2023, due to the Gaza war, Israel issued a travel advisory recommending its citizens to avoid travelling to Muslim countries, including Malaysia, due to "security concerns". In March 2026, it was reported that at least eight Israeli citizens, holding either Israeli passports only or Israeli and other foreign passports, had been detained while using Malaysia as a transit stop, necessitating Israeli ambassador to Singapore Eliyahu Vered Hazan to intervene and secure their releases and deportations. Of the eight, four had consulted an AI chatbot on the feasibility of travelling through Malaysia.

In July 2026, Malaysia reaffirmed its restrictions on the entry of Israeli nationals after reports that some Israeli citizens entered the country using other passports and were involved in the Network School programme in Johor. Prime Minister Anwar Ibrahim said that any Israeli nationals found to have entered Malaysia would be deported, reiterating Malaysia's policy of not recognising Israel. As of mid July, no evidence was found that Israelis were participating in the said programme.

== Jewish settlement in Malaysia ==
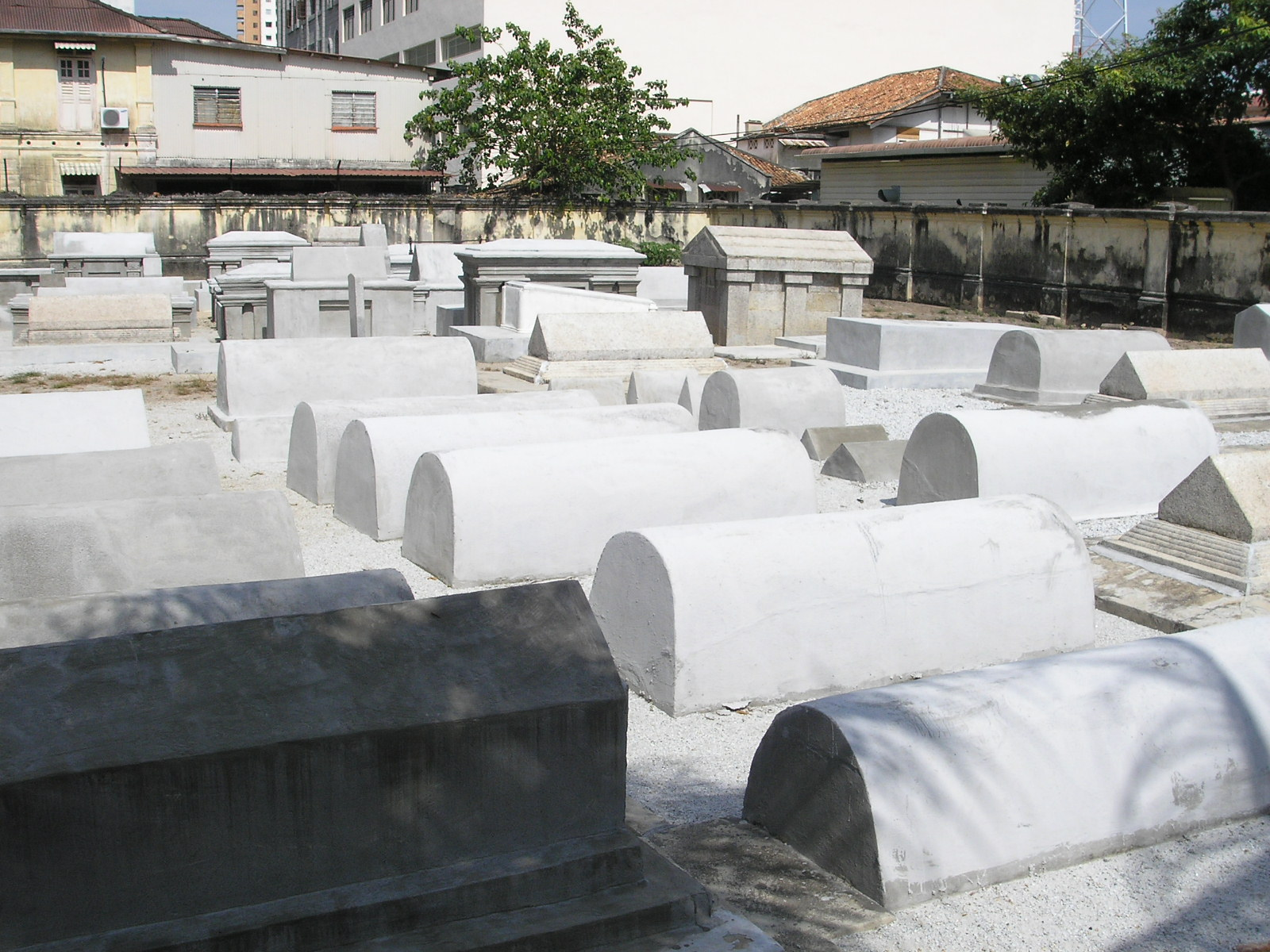
The Jewish Cemetery at Zainal Abidin Street (previously Jalan Yahudi or "Jewish Street") in George Town, Malaysia is believed to be the oldest in Southeast Asia. Previously. there was a Jewish enclave in the island of Penang before the inhabitants gradually emigrated or died out.

The first and only Jewish cemetery in Malaysia is known to have existed since 1805 in Penang. The first known Jew to have settled in Malaya was named Ezekiel Aaron Menasseh. During the Second World War, many Jews were relocated to Singapore. After the war, most Jews remained in Singapore or emigrated to Australia, the United States, or Israel. In 1963, only 20 Jewish families remained in Penang. The Jews stayed in Penang until the 1970s, when most of them emigrated to other countries. There are now 107 tombstones in the Jewish cemetery. In 2011, David Mordecai, the last known ethnic Jew on Penang Island, died.

== See also ==
- History of the Jews in Malaysia
- Foreign relations of Israel
- Foreign relations of Malaysia
