= Ben-Dror Yemini =

Israeli journalist

- בן-דרור ימיני
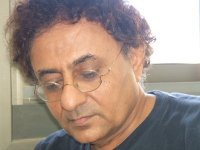
- Born: April 17, 1954 (age 72); Tel Aviv, Israel
- Occupation: Journalist

Ben-Dror Yemini (Hebrew: בן-דרור ימיני; born April 17, 1954) is an Israeli journalist. He has worked for the daily newspaper Maariv, and in Spring 2014 began writing for the daily Yedioth Ahronoth.

== Biography ==
Ben-Dror Yemini was born in Tel Aviv to a Yemenite Jewish family. He studied Humanities and History at Tel Aviv University and then pursued a degree in law. After graduation, he worked as an advisor to the Israeli Minister of Immigration Absorption and then became spokesman of the Ministry.

In 1984, he began his career as a journalist. His book Political Punch is a critique of politics and society in Israel. Between 2003 and 2014, Yemini was the opinion page editor of Maariv.

In 2014 Yemini began writing for the daily Yedioth Ahronoth. In 2014 he published a book The Industry of Lies dealing with the lack of accountable reporting in contemporary media.

Most of his newspaper articles are intended to refute what he regards as anti-Israel claims. He has published articles about the Israeli-Arab conflict in which he examines the issues of genocide, refugees, Palestinian and Arab capital, the status of Israeli Arabs, multiculturalism and the status of women. He argues that "anti-Zionism is politically correct anti-Semitism": the same way Jews were demonized, Israel is being demonized; the same way the right of Jews to exist was denied, the right for self-determination is denied to Israel; and the same way Jews were presented as a menace to the world, Israel is presented as a menace to the world.

== Views ==
While Karl Vick, Jerusalem bureau chief for Time magazine, identified Yemini as a conservative columnist, Yemini writes that he has been mislabeled as a right-winger and that he has a "long track record in the Israeli peace camp"; he also says that he met with Yasser Arafat in Tunis and that he has several friends who are PLO officials. He says that he is a long-time believer in a two-state solution, believes that Israel should have the same right of self-determination as the Palestinians and opposes settlements in the occupied territories. In 2012, while articulating support for Israel's motive behind Operation Pillar of Defense, Yemini expressed his support in "[making] a move which no one expects – follow a unilateral cease-fire by inviting Hamas to peace talks."

Yemini has criticized what he considers to be the international community's obsession, especially that of the United Nations Human Rights Council, solely on condemning Israel while turning a blind eye to much worse war crimes, massacres and atrocities committed by others.

"But let’s not say that the world in general, and the free world in particular, does not have a conscience. On the contrary: a protest is going on. A protest against Israel. Almost exclusively against Israel. Millions are being killed in the world. But the protests, the articles, the rallies are mainly against Israel. Most of the resolutions of the United Nations’ Human Rights Council, in its previous and current round, are against Israel. [...] It must be said, loud and clear: the manipulative and poisonous protest against Israel paves the way for the free world’s silence in light of the massacres and crimes against humanity that are really taking place. There is no global protest against massacres. There is a groundless and exaggerated protest against Israel. There are no human morals here. There is hypocrisy and political fraud."

== Books ==
- Yemini, Ben-Dror (24 October 2017). Industry of Lies : Media, Academia, and the Israeli-Arab Conflict. CreateSpace Independent Publishing Platform, Amazon Digital Services LLC: Institute for the Study of Global Antisemitism and Policy (ISGAP). ISBN 978-1979061438.
