= Port of Sulina =

- Click on the map for a fullscreen view

Location
- Country: Romania
- Location: Tulcea County
- Coordinates: 45°09′N 29°37′E
- UN/LOCODE: ROSUL

Details
- Owned by: Capitania Port Sulina
- Type of harbour: Natural/Artificial
- Size of harbour: 0.75 square kilometres
- Land area: 0.25 square kilometres
- Size: 100 hectares (1 square kilometres)
- No. of berths: 4

Statistics
- Annual cargo tonnage: 1,400,000 tonnes (2008)
- Website; Port of Sulina

The Port of Sulina is a Romanian port situated on the Black Sea, close to the northern border with Ukraine. Located in Sulina, it is the last city through which the Danube flows before entering the Black Sea. The port has a quay length of 5,940 m (19,490 ft) and depths of between 2.5 m (8.2 ft) and 7.5 m (25 ft).

The Port of Sulina is mainly used by the Sulina Shipyard.
