= Benjamin Ladraa =

Swedish human rights activist

Benjamin Ladraa is a Swedish human rights activist. He is best known for advancing awareness of human rights violations in the occupied West Bank by embarking on a solo 4,800-kilometre (3,000 mi) trek from Gothenburg, Sweden to Jerusalem, via thirteen countries: Germany, Czech Republic, Slovakia, Austria, Slovenia, Croatia, Serbia, Bulgaria, Greece, Turkey, Lebanon, and Jordan.

== Early life ==
Ladraa was born in Umeå, Sweden. He was born to Jewish parents and is of Swedish-Algerian descent.

On graduating from high school, Ladraa undertook 4 years of coursework in music before shifting to majoring in Global Studies. He spent a year in Japan learning Japanese. His interest in the plight of Palestinians arose from a friendship he developed with a Palestinian immigrant family. He failed to complete his university degree when his last course on Human Rights coincided with a hunger strike he participated in. In 2016, after a gig in Paris, he went to Nablus for three weeks, playing as drummer in a music project named "Ethno." During his stay he also visited Hebron, which he toured with Issa Amro's Youth Against Settlements movement and was struck particularly by the street segregation practiced by Israeli settlers there.

== Activism ==
Ladraa was an employee of the Red Cross before his walk. Stirred by the living conditions he witnessed during a three-week trip in April 2017 to the occupied West Bank, he organized a hunger strike in solidarity with one held by 1,600 Palestinian political prisoners in Israeli jails. He recalled: "I was shocked by what I saw there, seeing all the walls, soldiers walking along the streets carrying M-60 machine guns. I heard stories about 300 children in prisons, rapes in homes". In 2017, Ladraa began mapping his trek from Gothenburg to Jerusalem to raise awareness to human rights violations in the West Bank; he sold all of his belongings to fund the journey, which was promoted on social media under the hashtag #WalkToPalestine.

=== Trek ===
Ladraa began the walk, setting himself to trek on an average 8–10 miles a day, by setting out from Gothenburg, on 5 August 2017 to coincide with the centenary of the Balfour Declaration. Traveling lightly, he anticipated reaching his destination by June or July 2018. During the trip, which took him through 13 countries, he managed to get more than 18,000 followers on Instagram and more than 20,000 on Facebook. His journey, much of which involved making a reverse trip down the pathways used by refugees during the recent European migrant crisis, met generally with goodwill and curiosity from Europeans, with only two incidents marring the trek: he was punched up when he accidentally got mixed up in a demonstration in Germany, and was detained in the Czech Republic and subject to a personal search by Israeli security guards near their embassy in Prague for carrying a Palestinian flag. People noting him often phoned their local police. One woman in Austria, sighting the Palestinian flag he carries, called police who, pointing several pistols, confronted him aggressively. At journey's end Ladraa stated that he had met "everything from the military police and secret services to normal police, civilian police, anti-terror police, (and) Swat teams" as a result. Palestinian embassies in Europe provided support by informing Ladraa of Palestinians along his route who would be sympathetic to his project. Along the way, Ladraa engaged in discussions hoping to promote awareness of developments in the West Bank, and, as he came to prominence, was called upon to chair lectures on injustices.

He entered Lebanon via the port of El Mina where intelligence police questioned him for six hours. He then travelled through the country and collected testimonies from Palestinians about their plight while visiting the Beddawi, Nahr al-Bared, and Mar Elias Palestinian refugee camps. Unable to enter Israel from Lebanon, he went north to Beirut and flew to Amman, from where he walked to the Jordanian border.

On 6 July 2018, after reaching the Allenby crossing, linking Jordan to the West Bank, and just a few hundred yards from his destination, Ladraa was detained and interrogated for 6 hours and denied entry by Israeli officials. The formal grounds on which his application to enter Palestine was rejected were that he was considered mendacious, and that his real purpose was to "orchestrate protests in Nabi Saleh," an accusation he strongly denied. For his efforts, Palestinian President Mahmoud Abbas granted Ladraa citizenship and awarded him the Medal of Merit.

== See also ==
- List of peace activists

== Sources ==
- "Abbas grants Benjamin Ladraa Palestinian nationality, Ashrawi extends gratitude". Ma'an News Agency. 7 July 2018.
- Alreemawi, Yousef; Mashni, Nasser; Martin, Robert; Ladraa, Benjamin (17 March 2018). "Interview with Benjamin Ladraa, a Swedish activist who walked from Sweden to Palestine". 3CR.
- Batakji, Raissa (18 June 2018). "From Sweden to Palestine on Foot". Lebanese American University.
- Ben-Ozer, Tamar (13 February 2018). "Swedish man walking 4800 km to raise awareness for Palestinian cause". The Jerusalem Post.
- Celeste, Andrea (15 October 2017). "Swedish activist embarks on year-long walk to Palestine". Jordan Times.
- "Interview with Benjamin Ladraa - #walktopalestine". Maribor is the Future. January 2018 – via SoundCloud.
- "Israel denies Swedish peace activist entry to Palestine". Aljazeera. 8 July 2018.
- Nasser, Zeina (27 June 2018). "The untold details of Benjamin Ladraa's walk to Palestine". An-Nahar.
- Shafi, Salah Abdel (20 November 2017). "Treffen mit Benjamin Ladraa von Walk to Palestine" [Meeting Benjamin Ladraa from Walk to Palestine] (in German). Vertretung des Staates Palästina in Österreich.
- Springmann, J. Michael (8 November 2017). "Swede Shows the Way to Palestine, Hiking Nearly 3,000 Miles". Arab America.
- Stoughton, India (23 June 2018). "The Swedish activist walking to raise awareness about Palestinian rights". The National.
- "Swedish activist marks 200 days". MEMO. 19 February 2018b.
- Töyrä, Fredrik (8 July 2018). "Umeåbon Benjamin vandrade från Göteborg till Palestina" [Umeå resident Benjamin walked from Gothenburg to Palestine]. SVT Nyheter (in Swedish).
- "Walk to Palestine: Activist walking 5,000km". Aljazeera. Al Jazeera. 7 March 2018.
- "Walk to Palestine: Activist walking 5,000km". Al Jazeera. Anadolu. 7 March 2018.
- "Walking for Peace" (PDF). Campus Notes. LAU Magazine & Alumni Bulletin. Vol. 20, no. 2. Lebanese American University. Summer 2018. p. 58.
- "WalkToPalestine activist arrives in Turkey". MEMO. 16 March 2018a.
