= Killing of Hadeel al-Hashlamon =

- Location: Hebron, West Bank, Palestine
- Date: September 22, 2015
- Attack type: Homicide by gunshot
- Deaths: 1
- Perpetrator: Israel Defense Forces

Hadeel al-Hashlamon (Arabic: هديل الهشلمون) was an 18-year-old Palestinian woman who was shot and killed on September 22, 2015 by an Israeli soldier at a checkpoint in Hebron in the Israeli-occupied West Bank. According to Amnesty International, Hashlamon's killing constituted an extrajudicial execution due to her posing no threat. According to the Israel Defense Forces, Hashlamon was shot while trying to stab a soldier, but pro-Palestinian groups contested this, saying there is no video or photographic evidence of the moment of the shooting. Hashlamon was one of the first deaths of the 2015–2016 wave of violence in the Israeli-Palestinian conflict.

== The incident ==
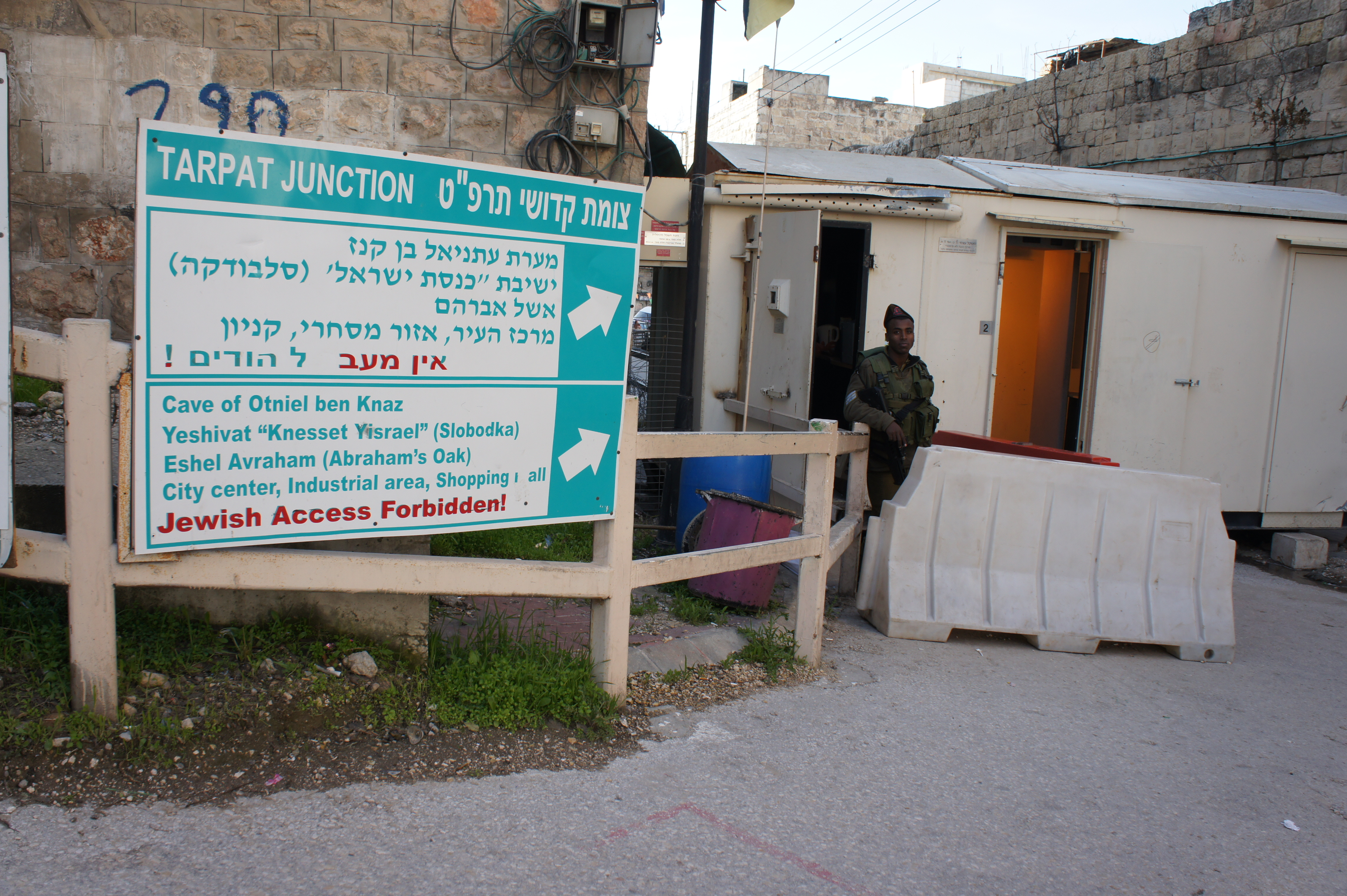
Checkpoint 56 in Hebron

According to human rights organization Amnesty International's report, which is based on two witness statements, and the IDF's report, the events that led to the killing of Hashlamon were as follows:

Hashlamon was on her way to school and had to pass through a checkpoint guarded by Israeli soldiers on Shuhada Street in Hebron. The checkpoint, known as Checkpoint 56 or Shoter, was a small pedestrian crossing limiting Palestinians' movements in the vicinity of Hebron's Jewish settlements. She arrived at the checkpoint 7:40 in the morning. She was wearing a black niqab that covered her body and her face.

A metal detector beeped when she tried to pass through the checkpoint and she was ordered to open her bag for a search. She was standing about three meters from the soldiers. She opened her bag and showed it to them who shouted at her, causing her to freeze.

According to the witness Fawaz Abu Aisheh, 34, who had stood close to Hashlamon in the checkpoint and spoken to her, the soldiers ordered her to "go back" in Hebrew - a language she didn't seem to know. Abu Aisheh who spoke Hebrew tried to mediate with the soldiers but they ignored his attempts. He also tried unsuccessfully to get Hashlamon to leave the checkpoint.

Four more soldiers arrived at the scene and pointed their guns at Hashlamon and Abu Aisheh. One of them fired a warning shot at the ground. The soldiers pushed Abu Aisheh away and refused his offer for translation help. At this point Hashlamon was behind metal rails separating her from the soldiers.

The soldier who shot the warning shot, shot Hashlamon in her left leg causing her to fall and drop her bag. According to Abu Aisheh, it also caused her to drop a knife with a brown handle that she had been hiding under her niqab. The soldier then moved closer to Hashlamon who lay motionless on the ground until he was standing over her and shot her four or five times in the chest. Other soldiers yelled at him to stop.

According to the IDF, Hashlamon continued to move towards the soldiers even after warning shots had been fired. But according to Amnesty, that claim is contradicted by witness statements and photos of Hashlamon showing her standing still. The photo the IDF released of Hashlamon's knife showed a knife with a blue and yellow handle which also didn't match the testimony of Abu Aisheh who said the handle was brown.

Hashlamon was left lying on the ground until ambulance arrived 30 to 40 minutes later. According to one witness report, a soldier checked her pulse but did not otherwise offer medical help. According to the human rights organization Euro-Mediterranean Human Rights Monitor (Euro-Med), soldiers refused to let ambulances through and medics to provide medical assistance. The ambulance first took her to the nearby settlement Kiryat Arba which lacks intensive care units. Eventually she was transferred to Shaare Zedek Medical Center in Jerusalem where she died of her wounds.

According to her father, a doctor in Hebron, the medical report that he received stated that Hashlamon died of bleeding and multiple organ failure as a result of multiple gunshot wounds.

A funeral procession was held in Hebron the next day which thousands of Palestinian mourners gathered to pay their respects. A demonstration was held in which the protestors demanded an international protection force to protect them from Israeli soldiers.

== Footage of the incident ==
The Hebron-based activist group Youth Against Settlements published a set of photos on their Facebook page from the incident seconds before Hashlamon was shot. The photos were taken by a Brazilian volunteer, Marcel Lame, of the Ecumenical Accompaniment Programme in Palestine and Israel who also published them on his blog. They showed Israeli soldiers pointing their guns at her and the witness Abu Aisheh and were widely circulated in Israeli, Palestinian and international media. The Palmedia media center published a two-and-a-half minute long video on its Youtube-channel showing Hashlamon's lifeless body lying on the ground while settlers and other bystanders watch. No knife can be seen in the video.

== Amnesty International and B'Tselem investigations ==
The human rights organization Amnesty International investigated the killing of Hashlamon and concluded in a report issued a few days after the incident that the evidence indicated that it was an extrajudicial execution. It claimed that Hashlamon "at no time posed a sufficient threat to the soldiers to make their use of deliberate lethal force permissible" and that it was the latest in a long line of unlawful killings carried out by Israeli forces in the occupied West Bank with impunity.

The Israeli human rights organization B'Tselem also investigated the killing and found that there was no justification for shooting Hashlamon with multiple bullets. However, the organization did not claim that the incident was an extrajudicial killing.

== IDF investigation ==
The IDF conducted an investigation into the killing of Hashlamon. In its report issued about a month after the killing, it claimed that she did have a knife, that the soldiers "acted with restraint, telling her to lower her knife repeatedly for several moments" and that shooting her was justified. However, the investigation also claimed that the soldiers "could have aimed lower and fired fewer bullets than they did." The report concluded that the unit did not commit any criminal wrongdoing.

== Responses ==
In a report published in October 2015, Euro-Med listed the killing of Hashlamon as one example of "Israel's arbitrary killings and its system of structural violence."

The United Nations High Commissioner for Human Rights on January 20, 2016 on issues of concern in the occupied Palestinian territories. The killing of Hashlamon was mentioned as one example in which "Israeli security forces, sometimes allegedly acting with disproportionate force, to the extent that extrajudicial killings are strongly suspected."

On February 17, 2016, nine American congressmen and Senator Patrick Leahy wrote a letter to the US State Department inquiring about "specific allegations of gross violations of human rights" by the security forces of Egypt and Israel. Among the allegations listed were the killing of Hadeel al-Hashlamon. They asked the State Department to determine whether the reports were credible and if so whether they would trigger the Leahy Law, a law that can cause the suspension of military aid to countries found guilty of human rights violations.

== See also ==
- List of violent incidents in the Israeli–Palestinian conflict, 2015
- 2015–2016 wave of violence in Israeli-Palestinian conflict
- Extrajudicial killing
