= Jerusalem Declaration =

Jerusalem Declaration may refer to:

- The Jerusalem Declaration on Christian Zionism, a 2006 statement issued by Palestinian Christian churches rejecting Christian Zionism
- The Jerusalem Declaration of the Global Anglican Future Conference, a 2008 statement of Christian belief
- The Jerusalem Declaration on Antisemitism, a 2021 guide on antisemitism particularly with regard to Israel and Palestine
