= Munib Younan =

Palestinian Bishop Emeritus

The Right Reverend Munib Younan D.D.
- Bishop Emeritus of the Evangelical Lutheran Church in Jordan and the Holy Land
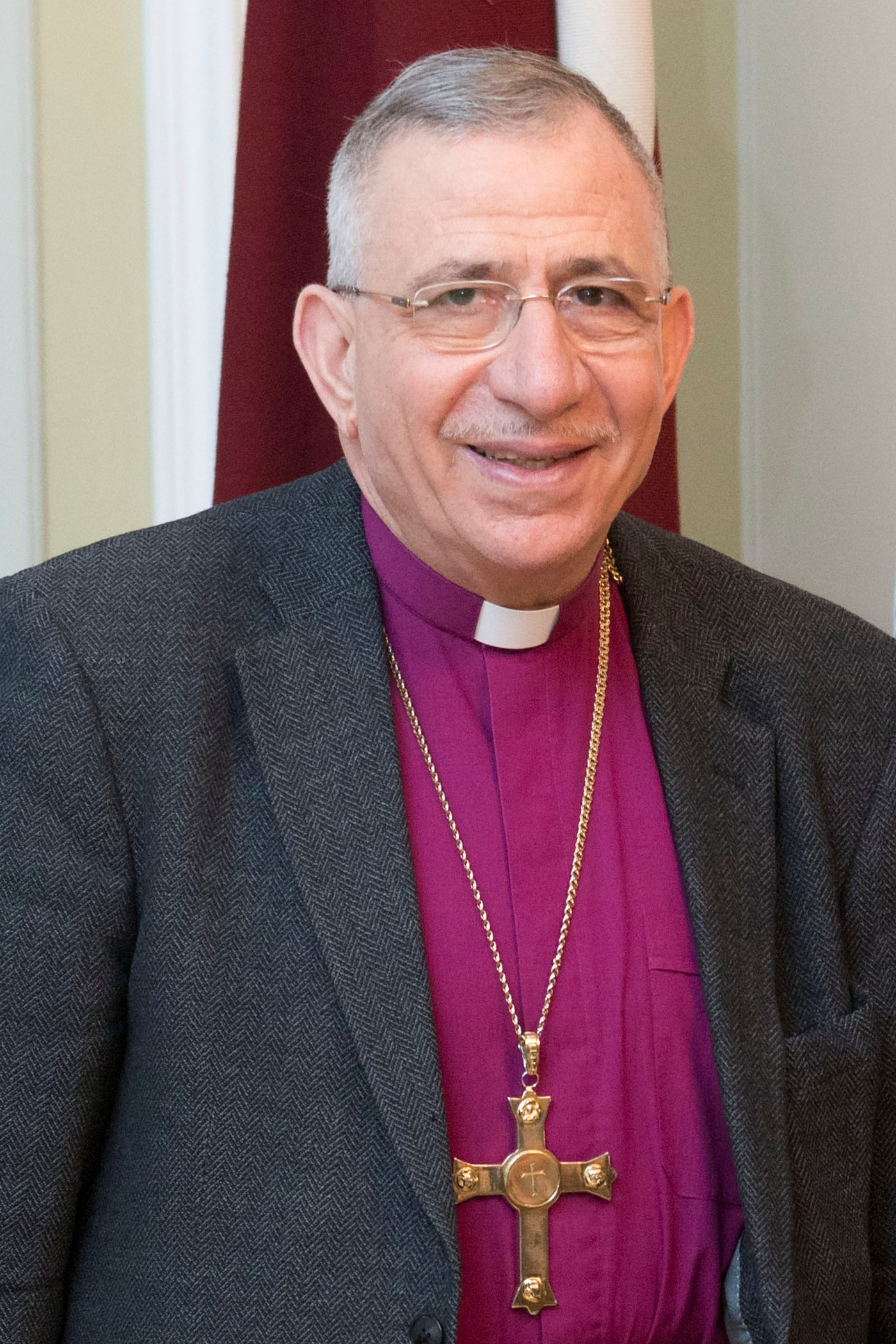
- Bishop Munib Younan in 2015
- Native name: منيب يونان
- Church: Evangelical Lutheran Church in Jordan and the Holy Land
- Installed: 1998
- Term ended: 2018

Orders
- Ordination: 1976
- Consecration: 5 January 1998

Personal details
- Born: Munib Younan; 18 September 1950 (age 76) Jerusalem
- Denomination: Lutheran
- Parents: Andria Younan & Alice Qandalaft
- Spouse: Suad Yacoub
- Children: 3
- Education: University of Helsinki; Lutheran School of Theology at Chicago

Munib Younan (Arabic: منيب يونان, romanized: Munīb Yūnān (Note: transliterated in Hebrew: מוניב יונאן)Arabic pronunciation: [mʊ.niːb juː.naːn]; born 18 September 1950) is a Palestinian bishop emeritus of the Evangelical Lutheran Church in Jordan and the Holy Land (ELCJHL).

From January 1998 to January 2018 he was Bishop of the ELCJHL. He retired in January 2018, but continues to serve as Bishop Emeritus, and remains a member of the Church Council of ELCJHL.

He served as President of the Lutheran World Federation from 2010 to 2017.

== Early life and education ==
Munib Younan was born into a Jerusalemite family of Assyrian origin that converted to Protestantism.

He studied deaconry and theology in Finland. He began studies in deaconry at Luther Opisto (college) in Järvenpää 1969–1972. Thereafter Younan studied theology at the Helsinki University in 1972–1976, receiving a Master of Arts in Theology in 1976. He also studied theology at the Lutheran School of Theology at Chicago in 1988.

Younan has been married since 1980 to Suad Yacoub from Haifa, whose family originates from Kfar Bir'im. Mrs. Younan is the Director of the Helen Keller School for the Blind in Beit Hanina. They have three children and several grandchildren.

== Career and activities ==
Younan was ordained at the Church of the Redeemer in Jerusalem and served pastorates in Jerusalem, Beit Jala, and Ramallah. Since 1990 Younan served as the president of the ELCJHL synod. In 1998 Younan was consecrated bishop of the ELCJHL.

He has also chaired the Board of Directors for the LWF owned Augusta Victoria Hospital in Jerusalem. Younan is the patron of Gospel Riders Jerusalem - a motorcycle club operating in cooperation with Finnish Evangelical Lutheran Mission.

Younan has been actively engaged in the Middle East Council of Churches, in various positions since 1985 including as the president of its Evangelical Family until 2018. Younan served as president of the Fellowship of the Middle East Evangelical Churches (FMEEC) in 2004–2010, which during his presidency unanimously voted if favor of the ordination of women as pastors. Younan is also a founding member of the Ecumenical Accompaniment Programme in Palestine and Israel (EAPPI), serving as the chair of Local Reference Group since 2002.

Younan is a co-founder of the Council of Religious Institutions in the Holy Land, made up of the two chief rabbis of Israel, heads of the local churches, the Chief Judge of the Islamic Court in Palestine and other Muslim leaders. In 2006, Younan was a co-signatory of the Jerusalem Declaration on Christian Zionism. On 15 December 2009, he signed the Kairos Palestine Document along with 12 other Palestinian patriarchs and heads of church from other Christian denominations. The document references the 1985 Kairos South Africa Document and condemns what it calls "the military occupation of our land [...] a sin against God and humanity" and characterises what it perceives as such as "oppression, displacement, suffering and clear apartheid for more than six decades". It calls for international support and "peace with the establishment of an independent Palestinian state with Al-Quds as its capital".

Younan was elected on 24 July 2010 President of the Lutheran World Federation (LWF), an organization that represents 145 churches in 79 countries around the world representing 70 million Christians. In his role as LWF President, Younan has demonstrated untiring leadership speaking to Lutheran Church gatherings in numerous settings on five continents and represented Lutherans in Ecumenical Discussions. Previously he had served as the LWF vice president for the Asian region from 2004 to 2009. He sits on the board of trustees of the Yasser Arafat Foundation.

On 31 October 2016, with Pope Francis and The Lutheran World Federation General Secretary The Rev. Martin Junge, Younan signed a Joint Statement commemorating the Lutheran Reformation and Historical Reconciliation between the Lutheran and Roman Catholic Churches. The co-hosted service was the first of its kind in 500 years.

== Achievements ==
Younan is the author of two books. In Witnessing for Peace: In Jerusalem and in the World, published by Augsburg Fortress Press in 2003, Younan presents the historical and social context of the Palestinian situation, beginning with the not-well-known story of Arab Christianity and his own indigenous Assyrian background. He elaborates his own theology of nonviolence, centered on the call to witness, heeding a call to justice, inclusion, and forgiveness. Our Shared Witness: A Voice for Justice and Reconciliation is a compilation of some of Younan's speeches, sermons, articles and conference presentations that reflect his prophetic voice. He also edited the Augsburg Confession in Arabic (Emerezian Est., Jerusalem, 1993). He is the author of many other articles and a participant at conferences throughout the world.

Younan is also recognized as a leader of interfaith dialogue and an advocate for dialogue, peace, and gender justice issues in Palestine and Israel. After his retirement bishop Younan has been nominated honorary president of Religions for Peace.

== Distinctions ==
=== Ecclesiastical decorations ===
- St. Henrik Cross from the Evangelical Lutheran Church in Finland (2011)

=== Academic distinctions ===
- Honorary doctorate from Wartburg College in Iowa, US (2001)
- Honorary doctorate from University of Münster, Germany (2014)
- Honorary doctorate from University of Helsinki, Finland (2023).

=== Awards and prizes ===
- The Sunhak Peace Prize, Korea (2020)
- The Building Bridges of Understanding Award, Georgetown University, Washington, DC (2018)
- Niwano Peace Prize, Japan (2017)
- Mikael Agricola Medallion, Finland (2008)
- Templar Peace Prize (2007)
- Bethlehem Star Award from Palestinian President Mahmoud Abbas (2005)
- Holyland Christian Ecumenical Foundation (HCEF) Prize, Washington, DC (2004)
- Bethanien (Bethany) Prize, Methodist Church, Oslo, Norway (2004)
- Human Rights Award from the United Nations Association, Washington, DC (2001)
- The Finnish Peace Prize from the Finnish Christian Peace Movement (2001)

== See also ==
- Palestinian Christians
