= Issa Amro =

Palestinian human rights activist (born 1980)

- عيسى عمرو
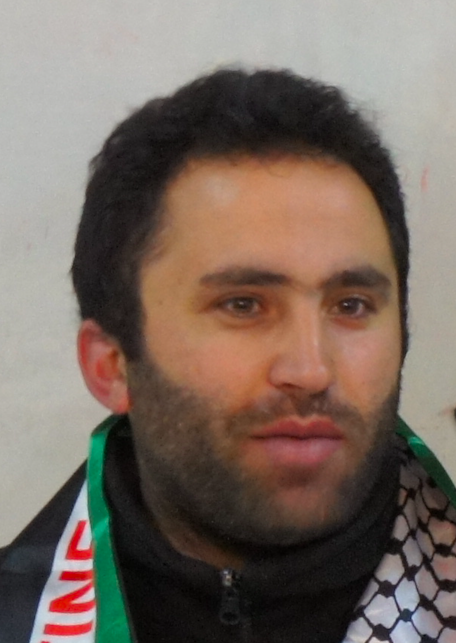
- Amro in 2012
- Born: April 13, 1980 (age 46); Hebron, West Bank
- Years active: 2003–present
- Known for: Human rights defender and grassroots activist in the Israeli–Palestinian conflict

Issa Amro (Arabic: عيسى عمرو; born 13 April 1980) is a Palestinian activist based in Hebron, West Bank. He is the co-founder and former coordinator (2007–2018) of the grassroots group Youth Against Settlements. Amro advocates the use of nonviolent resistance and civil disobedience to fight the Israeli Occupation of the Palestinian Territories. In 2010, he was declared "human rights defender of the year in Palestine" by the Office of the United Nations High Commissioner for Human Rights In 2013, the United Nations Human Rights Council expressed concern for his wellbeing and safety due to numerous accounts of harassment from Israeli soldiers and settlers and a series of arbitrary arrests. At present, Amro is being indicted by the Israeli military court with 18 charges against him. In May 2017, Bernie Sanders along with three U.S. senators and 32 congressmen wrote to Secretary of State Rex Tillerson to urge Israeli authorities to reconsider the charges against Amro.

In September 2017, Amro was arrested by the Palestinian Authority (PA) for using Facebook to criticise the PA for arresting a journalist. In March 2019, Amnesty International demanded that the Palestinian authorities drop all charges against him, adding "It is disgraceful that Issa Amro is facing a prison term simply for expressing his views promoting human rights online."

In late September 2017, after being released on bail, Amro met Bernie Sanders and members of Congress in Washington DC.

== Activism ==
=== Early years ===
Amro grew up in the Hebron's Old City near Shuhada Street in an area that is now closed to Palestinians. His father, a school teacher, moved his family into H1 during the First Intifada when Amro was seven years old, as recounted in The Way to the Spring by Ben Ehrenreich.

Two years after the start of the Second Intifada, the Israeli army declared the Palestine Polytechnic University a closed military zone and sealed off its entrances. Amro, who was then in his last year of an engineering degree, decided to take action against the closures. With the participation of other students of the university, Amro organized actions of nonviolent resistance and civil disobedience for half a year. These actions included protests and demonstrations, moving into classrooms, sit-ins, and having lessons in the presence of Israeli soldiers. The campaigning was a success and the university was reopened in June.

Amro describes this victory as his gateway into resistance against the occupation. He took inspiration from known human rights defenders, such as Martin Luther King Jr., Mahatma Gandhi, and Nelson Mandela. He stated in a piece for The Guardian:

"I became convinced that their non-violent method was the best strategy for community resistance. Furthermore non-violence meant that there was a role for every Palestinian. ... My campaigning, my whole philosophy, everything I do now, is underpinned by these ideas."

Amro became part of B'Tselem and won the One World Media award in 2009 for the "Shooting Back" camera project, which he coordinated in Hebron. The project distributed cameras to Palestinians for the purpose of documenting human rights violations by Israeli soldiers and settlers. In 2008, B'Tselem reported an occasion where Amro himself was prevented from documenting Israeli settler disturbances, after which he was then beaten and arrested by Israeli military.

=== Youth Against Settlements ===
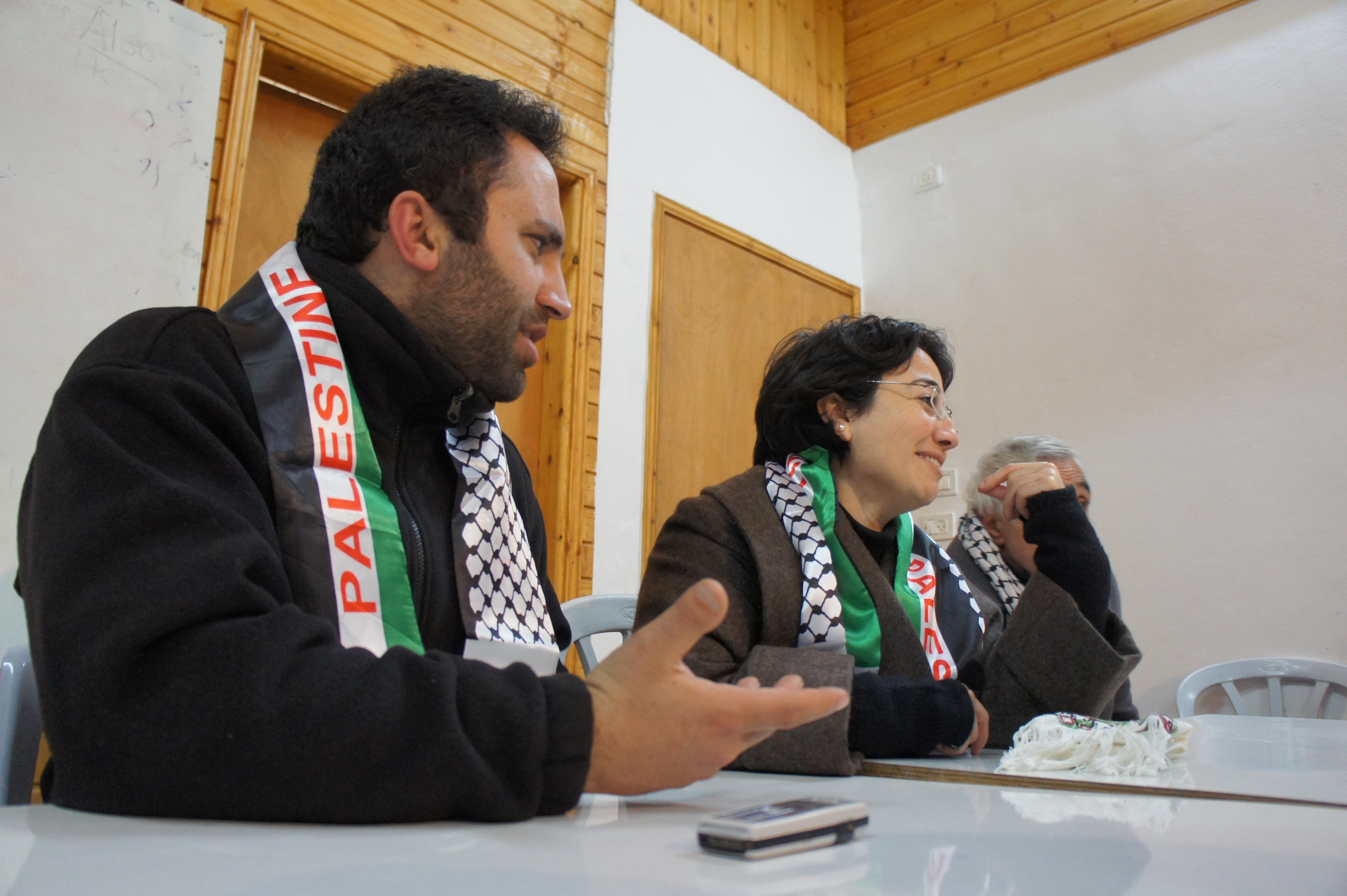
Issa Amro and Haneen Zoabi, inside the Youth Against Settlements house, Hebron, February, 2012

Amro is the coordinator Youth Against Settlements (YAS), which he describes as his major project to involve young Palestinians in nonviolent resistance against the Israeli occupation. He stated that his dream is to see nonviolence used as the methodology for a massive Palestinian resistance against the occupation. He co-founded YAS in 2007 as a group that documents and protests against human rights violations. The group's leading campaign is Open Shuhada Street, which calls for an end to the closures and restrictions enforced on Hebron's main street. The campaign takes place in several countries worldwide.

=== 2015—present ===
During the surge of violence throughout the Palestinian territories in autumn 2015, Amro worked to discourage Palestinian youths from carrying out knife attacks: in their place, he advocated a nonviolent approach to resistance. He stated that he felt more worried about being shot by the Israeli army during these times than ever before.

At the regular session of the UN Human Rights Council in September 2015, Amro said that he was "extremely concerned" with the situation in Palestine during this time and stated that "the erupting violence over the past weeks…can only end when international law is applied." He mentioned the case of 18-year-old Hadil Hashlamoun, who on the 22 September of that year had been shot and killed by Israeli forces, and whose death was reported as "unlawful" by Amnesty International:

"Mr. President, I was present when they took her body away, and saw the settlers and soldiers rejoice at her fate. We urgently need an impartial international investigation into her case," Amro stated.

Amro wrote an article for the Huffington Post in response to the Hebron shooting incident in March 2016. A video had been published by B'Tselem showing Israeli soldier Elor Azaria shooting Abdel Fattah al-Sharif in the head at point-blank range, while the Palestinian was lying wounded on the ground. In his article, Amro described being guarded by Azaria for seven hours during an arrest in March, which took place before the shooting incident. Amro did not consider the soldier to be "unusually fanatical or extreme." Instead, he blamed the normalization of anti-Palestinian hatred within the Israeli military, and Benjamin Netanyahu for "pulling verbal triggers of incitement" and denying freedom for Palestinians with his politics.

In October 2024, Amro and YAS were distinguished with the Swedish Right Livelihood Award, "for their steadfast nonviolent resistance to Israel’s illegal occupation, promoting Palestinian civic action through peaceful means." In December 2024, the French and German governments jointly awarded him the Franco-German Prize for Human Rights and the Rule of Law. Because Israeli soldiers denied the French and German representatives entry into Hebron, he accepted the award on a road outside an Israeli Defense Forces checkpoint.

Issa Amro appeared in Louis Theroux's 2025 documentary The Settlers, where he guided Theroux around the Israeli settlements in the West Bank. Amro stated that Israeli soldiers and settlers had raided his home in the aftermath, as part of what he believes was retaliation for his participation in the documentary.

== Harassment and arrests ==
In an article written for The Nation, Amro stated, "I have been arrested more times than I can count for nonviolent human-rights work."

In 2013, the Israeli army conducted an unannounced 'training exercise' at his home: "15 soldiers suddenly entered the family's yard at about 9pm. Wearing helmets, body armour and carrying weapons, they used a ladder to enter the house from an upstairs window."

In a statement from 2013, the UN Council of Human Rights addressed the issue of ongoing harassment of Amro. Juan E. Mendez, the United Nations Special Rapporteur on torture, expressed deep concern for Amro's "life, physical integrity and the psychological toll that [this harassment] is having on his health and family."

Amro was arrested and detained twenty times in 2012 without any charges filed against him, and on a further six occasions in 2013 up to the point that the aforesaid statement was written. It mentions an incident from 8 July 2013, when "Israeli soldiers allegedly beat Mr. Amro, taking photos of him on a stretcher and threatening to shoot him. He was hospitalized more than five hours later and summoned to the same police station the next day." The report also mentioned a recent "number of death threats from settler organizations" against him.

Special Rapporteur on the situation of human rights defenders, Margaret Sekaggya, described the acts against Amro as an "unacceptable campaign of harassment, intimidation and reprisals." The report also mentioned an Israeli raid undertaken on the Youth Against Settlements media center in July 2013, during which Israeli soldiers allegedly fired at Amro and three other activists. Special Rapporteur on the rights to freedom of peaceful assembly and of association, Maina Kiai, called for the protection of Youth Against Settlements members and for "those responsible for the unacceptable acts against Mr. Amro [to be] held accountable."

In addition to the incidents mentioned in the statement, Israeli right-wing politician Baruch Marzel was charged for an attack on Amro on 8 February 2013. He entered Amro's home and assaulted him for "unknown reasons." Reportedly, Amro was arrested on that day as a result of the occurrence, and later released. Amro stated in a regular session of the UN Human Rights Council in 2013 that according to his Israeli lawyer, all his arrests were arbitrary.

In 2014, Haaretz reported that an Israeli soldier stated that he only protects Jews, and proceeded to insult Amro and threaten to shoot him.

=== Trial ===
On 26 February 2016, Amro took part in a nonviolent demonstration calling for an end to the restrictions imposed on Hebron's Al-Shuhada Street. A few days later on 29 February while speaking to a tour group from Breaking the Silence, Amro was arrested and brought to the Gush Etzion settlement's detention center. There, he was accused of incitement and of having organizing protests Israel deems illegal. He was released the following day after being notified that he should to expect an invitation to appear in court. A police officer allegedly told him that he had no legal basis for the arrest but had received orders from above to carry it out. In response to the event, Amnesty International released a statement about Amro's arrest, which called for the Israeli government to "cease intimidation of human rights defenders."

On 15 July 2016, Youth Against Settlements began to establish a cinema in Hebron in cooperation with Center for Jewish Nonviolence. The action was suppressed by Israeli military and police. Shortly afterwards, Amro was indicted by an Israeli military court, and now faces 18 separate charges referring to putative infractions between 2010 and 2016. The charges include the accusations from March along with "insulting a soldier," "spitting in the direction of a settler," "entering a closed military zone," and other apparent offenses. There are 38 witnesses against him. Amro's Israeli lawyer, Gabi Lasky, stated that:

"... the fact that in this case he was released dozens of times over the years without any indictment, and suddenly an indictment is served that collects all the conduct for which he was released, absolutely seems to be a matter of political persecution."

An IDF spokesman stated that Amro had

"“taken part in riots, attacks on soldiers, calls to violence, and prevented security forces from doing their work."

Former UN Special Reporter on Palestine, Prof. Dr. Richard Falk, signed an urgent appeal dated 21 September 2016, coordinated by Scales for Justice. The appeal was sent to Zeid Ra'ad Al Hussein, United Nations High Commissioner for Human Rights, and called for the charges against Amro to be dropped and for an end to the harassment against him. While holding office in 2013, prior to the appeal, Falk had stated that Amro appeared to be the victim of a "pattern of harassment." Other petitions for Amro's case are led by organizations such as Jewish Voice for Peace and Code Pink: Women for Peace, who emphasized that the Israeli military court's conviction rate of Palestinians is over 99%. Amro would have faced trial on the 25 September 2016, but it was postponed. Jewish Voice for Peace. Writers Michael Chabon and Ayelet Waldman wrote about Amro's trial in an article for The New York Times entitled “Who’s Afraid of Nonviolence”, in which they condemned the charges. In May 2017, a group of four U.S. senators and 32 congressmen, led by Senator Bernie Sanders, wrote to Secretary of State Rex Tillerson, asking him to urge Israeli authorities to drop the charges against Amro.

=== Arrest by the Palestinian Authority ===
On 2 September 2017, he was arrested by the Palestinian Authority (PA) on charges of violating the new "electronic crimes" law. The actual offense was "denouncing on Facebook the arrest of a journalist calling for the resignation of PA head", acts which others have been tantamount to criticizing the Palestinian Authority. President Abbas has been criticized for the decree under which Amro was arrested which uses words such as "harming national unity" and references to "social fabric". Amro has complained that the decree is an attack on freedom of expression Diana Buttu, commenting on the law, parallels between the PA actions and Israel's crackdown on dissent with the occupation, stated:

The passage of this law, and the PA’s subsequent actions, make clear that neither Israel nor the authority will tolerate dissent.

On 9 September 2017, he was released on bail, following an outpouring of protests to the PA by human rights NGOs and others.

=== 2023 assault ===
While being interviewed by Lawrence Wright in Hebron on 13 February 2023, Amro was grabbed by the neck and thrown to the ground by an IDF soldier. The soldier was jailed by Israeli authorities for ten days for the assault.

=== 2025 raid ===
In May 2025, Amro stated that Israeli soldiers and settlers had raided his home, as part of what he believes was retaliation for his appearance in the documentary The Settlers. In November 2025, he told Associated Press that between 7 and 8 October 2025, his home was "attacked three times in the space of 12 hours."

== Bibliography ==
- Ehrenreich, Ben (2016). The Way to the Spring: Life and Death in Palestine. Penguin. pp. 174–179. ISBN 978-0-698-14819-2.
