= Ecumenical Accompaniment Programme in Palestine and Israel =

The Ecumenical Accompaniment Programme in Palestine and Israel is an international, ecumenical programme that recruits and despatches observers (known as Ecumenical Accompaniers - EAs) to several Palestinian towns and villages to monitor the interaction between the Palestinian inhabitants and the Israeli military. The presence of EAs is intended to offer protection and to moderate friction. Abuses of authority are monitored and reported and EAs speak publicly of their experiences. The EAPPI was founded in 2002 under the auspices of the World Council of Churches, in response to requests from Heads of Churches in Jerusalem. Bishop Munib Younan of the Evangelical Lutheran Church in Jordan and the Holy Land is also one of the founders.

Accompaniers have four stated tasks: to offer protection through nonviolent presence; to monitor and report violations of human rights and international humanitarian law; to support Israeli and Palestinian peace activists; to undertake advocacy work including public speaking.

EAPPI's website at present (November 2019) recruits accompaniers from Argentina, Australia, Austria, Brazil, Canada, Colombia, Denmark, Ecuador, Finland, France, Germany, Norway, Philippines, Poland, South Africa, Sweden, Switzerland, The Netherlands, United Kingdom & Ireland, United States of America, Uruguay, through local "sending organisations".

== Australia ==
In Australia, the EAPPI programme is promoted and managed by the EAPPI Desk of the National Council of Churches in Australia (NCCA), forum for 19 Australian Christian denominations and organisations. In November 2006, the NCCA's Executive committed itself to develop an "Australian EAPPI Desk" at the NCCA and in July 2007, at the 6th NCCA Forum it was resolved that: the National Forum commends the plans for the NCCA to recruit and train participants in the Ecumenical Accompaniment Programme in Palestine-Israel (EAPPI).

== Austria ==
The Ecumenical Council of Churches in Austria decided in October 2009 to support the EAPPI programme, which is implemented in cooperation with Diakonie Austria, the Austrian section of the International Fellowship of Reconciliation (Ger: Internationaler Versöhnungsbund) and Pax Christi Austria. EAPPI has received financial support from the city of Linz, the Benedictine Order of Melk, the Diocese of St. Pölten, private donors and various local parishes.

== United Kingdom & Ireland ==
In Britain and Ireland, EAPPI is managed by Quaker Peace and Social Witness on behalf of an ecumenical group that promotes the programme. In this broad ecumenical group are the Baptist Union of Great Britain, CAFOD, Christian Aid, Church of Scotland, Church Mission Society, Churches Together in Britain and Ireland, Iona Community, Methodist Church, Pax Christi UK, Scottish Episcopal Church, United Reformed Church and United Society for the Propagation of the Gospel.

The Church of England has supported EAPPI since its inception, through the CofE's membership of organisations such as the World Council of Churches, Churches Together in Britain and Ireland and Christian Aid. Several bishops have also given support through meetings with Ecumenical Accompaniers, for example and through grass roots meetings with EAs to share their experiences. The Church's General Synod has passed a motion "encouraging parishioners to volunteer for the programme and asking churches and synods to make use of the experience of returning participants." In March 2013, however, the new Archbishop of Canterbury, Justin Welby, expressed regret at his own failure to oppose the pro-EAPPI motion. His reasoning was that the motion did not "... adequately reflected the complexity... " of the situation in the Holy Land but indicated that he would have supported the motion if it had included that Israel had the right to "live in security and peace within internationally agreed borders, and the people of the region have the right to justice, peace, and security, whoever they are". Supporters of the motion pointed out that it had been drafted "with the advice of" Rowan Williams, Welby's immediate predecessor as archbishop. Subsequently, Archbishop Welby visited the Holy Land and, after observing Qalandiya checkpoint, between Ramallah and Jerusalem, with EAPPI observers he said, Seeing with them [EAPPI] the indignity that so many Palestinians suffer on a daily basis was an education.

== Criticism and praise ==
When the Church of England Synod passed its motion of support for EAPPI, it was criticised by the Board of Deputies of British Jews. Jon Benjamin, its then Chief Executive, was reported as saying that the EAPPI motion "helped to create a climate of hostility towards Israel within the Church of England". He was quoted: "The EAPPI narrative is based on the experience of volunteers who spend several months living alongside Palestinians in the Territories, but less than a day in Israel, and then return to address audiences who know little or nothing about the reality of everyday life for those on both sides of the conflict."

An article in the British-based Jewish Chronicle quoted an EAPPI accompanier as stating, "it is extremely difficult for them to speak out, in some ways. As you know, there is a really strong Jewish lobby in America." The article also quoted criticism of the group for "limiting contact with Israeli realities and reinforces the Palestinian victimisation narrative."

EAPPI responded to the criticism by making changes to the programme to ensure that volunteers would spend time in Jewish houses and hear other sides. Rabbi Laura Janner-Klausner, who chairs the UK branch of Rabbis for Human Rights, said the move would “counterbalance some of the initial discord between Jews and Christians that came as a result between of the Synod vote and reaction to it.”

EAPPI has also been praised by church leaders in Jerusalem for "demonstrating the positive role that churches play in Palestinian society, both Muslim and Christian."

== See also ==
- Community Peacemaker Teams
- Temporary International Presence in Hebron
- Women in Black
