= Al-Shuhada Street =

Street in Hebron, West Bank, Palestine

Al-Shuhada Street شارع الشهداء רחוב השוהדא
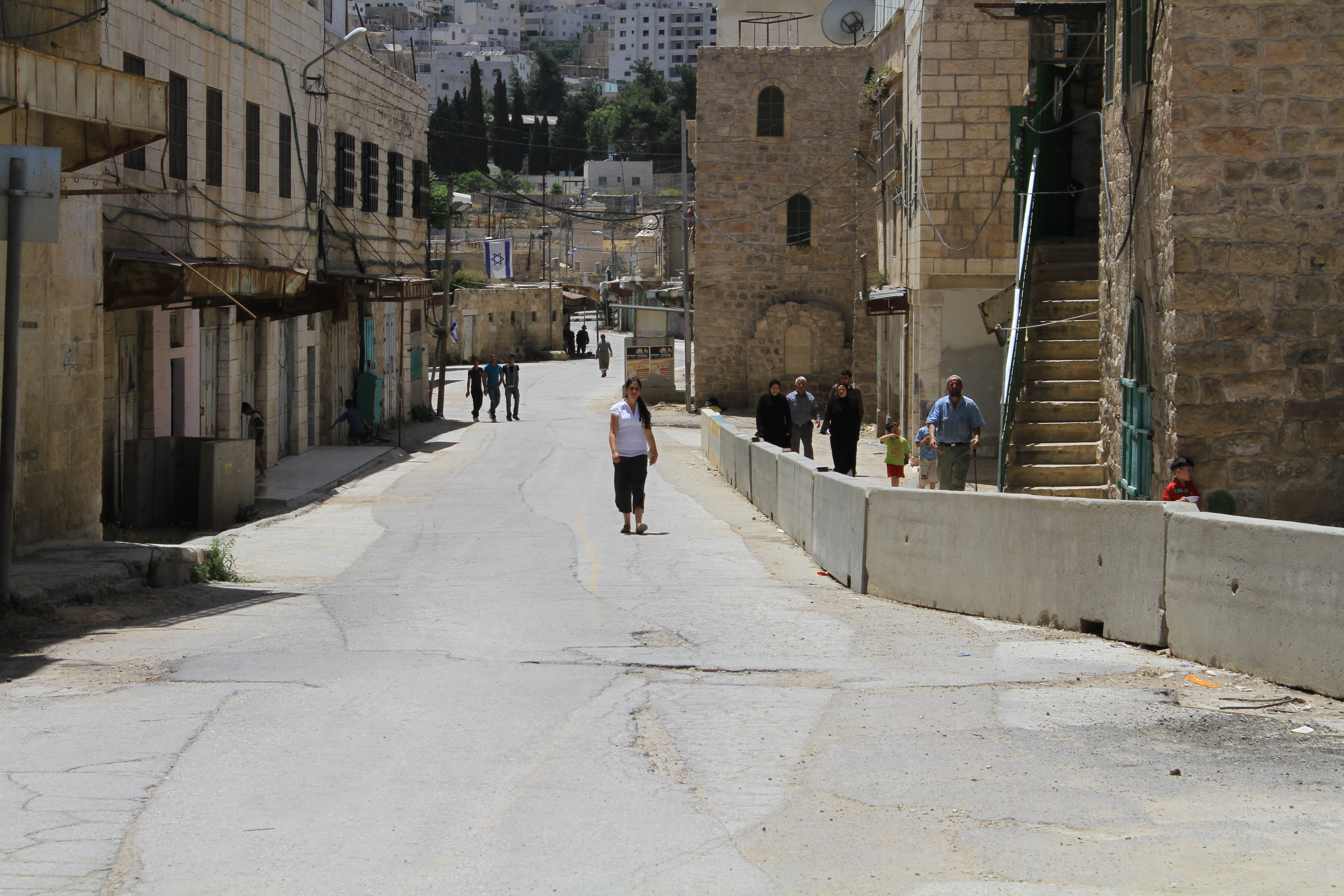
- Shuhada Street with closed Palestinian shops in 2010. The passing for Palestinians is forbidden, & only Israeli settlers and tourists are allowed to pass.
- Interactive map of Al-Shuhada Street شارع الشهداء רחוב השוהדא
- Location: Hebron, West Bank
- Coordinates: 31.526389°N 35.103278°E

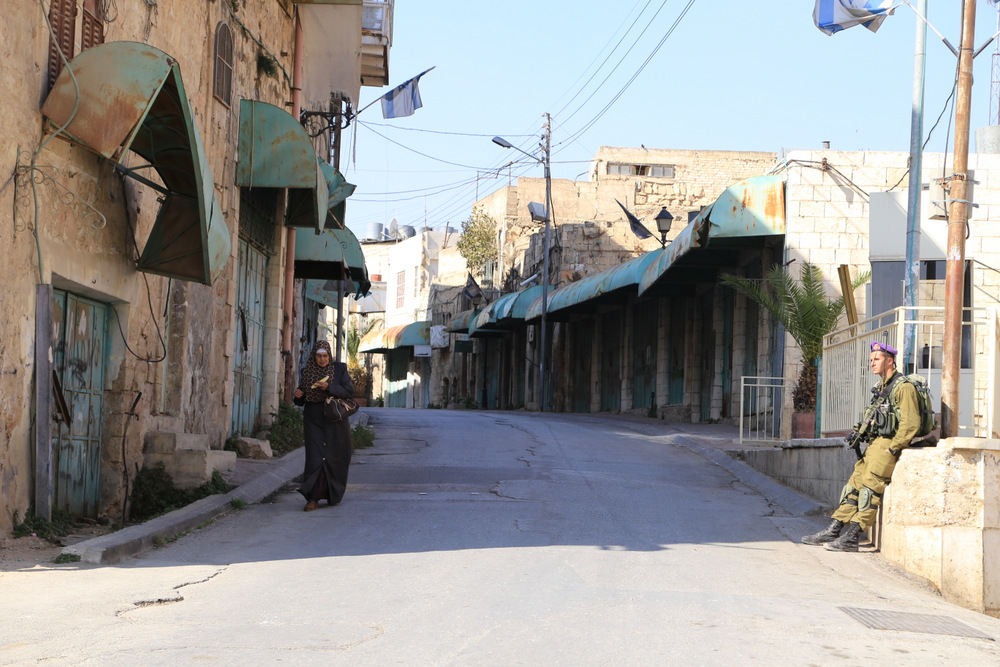
A 2012 photograph of an IDF soldier on duty at Shuhada Street. Since 2010 only Palestinians who live along the street may enter the street, and entry is permitted only to pedestrian traffic. Only Israeli cars can use the road for vehicular traffic.

Al-Shuhada Street (Arabic: شارع الشهداء, lit. 'Martyrs' Street'), nicknamed Apartheid Street by Palestinians and King David Street by Israeli settlers, is a street in the Old City of Hebron.

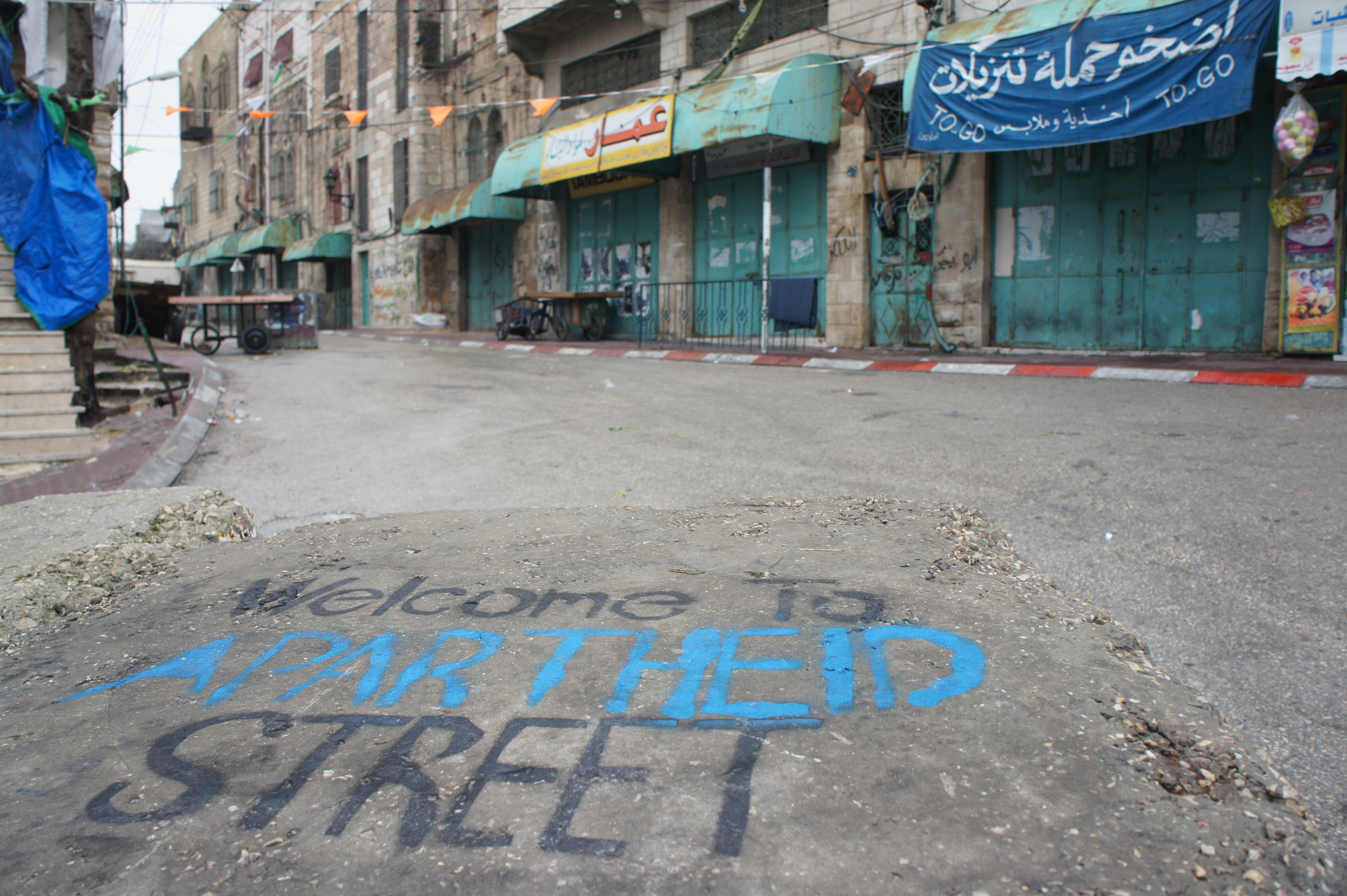
"Apartheid Street", painted on the road

Shuhada Street, the main road leading to the Tomb of the Patriarchs, used to be the central wholesale market of the Hebron region, as its central location to the tomb, and the location of the bus station and police station, made it a natural gathering place. After riots following the February 1994 Cave of the Patriarchs massacre, Israel closed the street for Palestinians. In the early 2000s, in accordance with the Hebron Protocol, the street was reopened to Arab vehicular traffic. The shops, however, remained closed. The street was closed again to Palestinians after violence in the Second Intifada.

After the closure of all Palestinian shops, the Palestinian municipal and governmental offices, and the central bus station, which became an Israeli army base, the area of al-Shuhada Street became virtually a ghost town. The vegetable and wholesale markets next to the Avraham Avinu settlement have become an area forbidden for Palestinians. An annual international "Open Shuhada Street" demonstration has been organized since 2010.

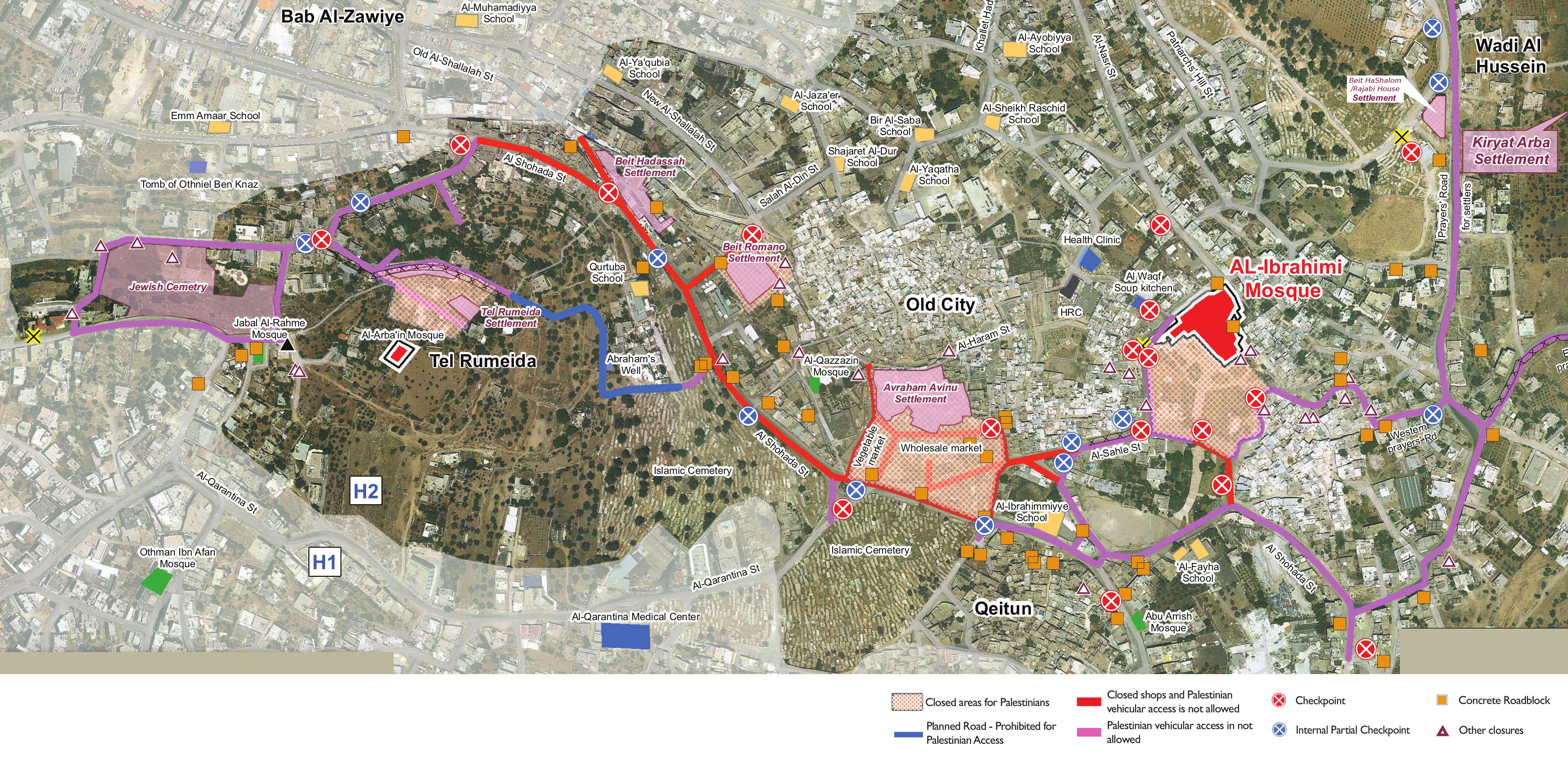
Map of the Shuhada Street, with closures as of 2011

== Name ==
While there are no official signs, al-Shuhada Street is the official name of the street, meaning Martyrs Street. Israelis call it "King David Street". In 2011, Palestinians temporarily renamed the street to "Apartheid Street". Explaining the change, Rafiq al-Jabari, aide to Hebron's Governor, said that the change would remain in place "until the end of the Apartheid segregation that is enforced by the settlers under the protection of occupation soldiers".

== History ==
Following the Israeli occupation of Hebron in 1967, a number of settlements were established in and around the city. The first settlement, being Kiryat Arba, was started in 1968 near the Cave of the Patriarchs, which is located a few hundred meters (yards) north of the Shuhada Street. Sarah Nachshon, the wife of its founder, started another settlement in a police station in the Shuhada Street in 1979.

In February 1994, a Jewish settler from Kiryat Arba killed 29 Muslims in the Cave of the Patriarchs massacre. Subsequently, the Yitzhak Rabin-led Government closed the Palestinian shops and prohibited Palestinian vehicular traffic in the nearby Shuhada Street, to protect the settlers. The army closed down 304 shops and warehouses along Shuhada Street, as well as Palestinian municipal and governmental offices. The central bus station was turned into an army base. The Tomb of the Patriarchs was divided into separate sections for Jewish and Muslim worshippers.

=== After the Hebron Protocol ===
In the 1997 Hebron Protocol, more specifically the Agreed Minute of 7 January 1997, Israel agreed to completely reopen the Shuhada Street and restore the situation which existed prior to February 1994 (article 7 of the Protocol). The street was reopened for traffic for a year; the shops, however, remained closed. In 1998, vehicles where prohibited again. The street was alternately opened and closed, until it was definitively closed for all Palestinians upon the Second Intifada. All entrances to the houses in al-Shuhada Street were sealed. Since then, the house owners can only enter their home through climbing the roofs or through holes in the wall.

In 2005, after the ACRI had petitioned the state, Israel presented to the High Court a "plan for protection of the Jewish community in Hebron", according to which Palestinians would be allowed to walk on the street, but the prohibition on opening shops and on vehicular traffic on the street would remain in force.

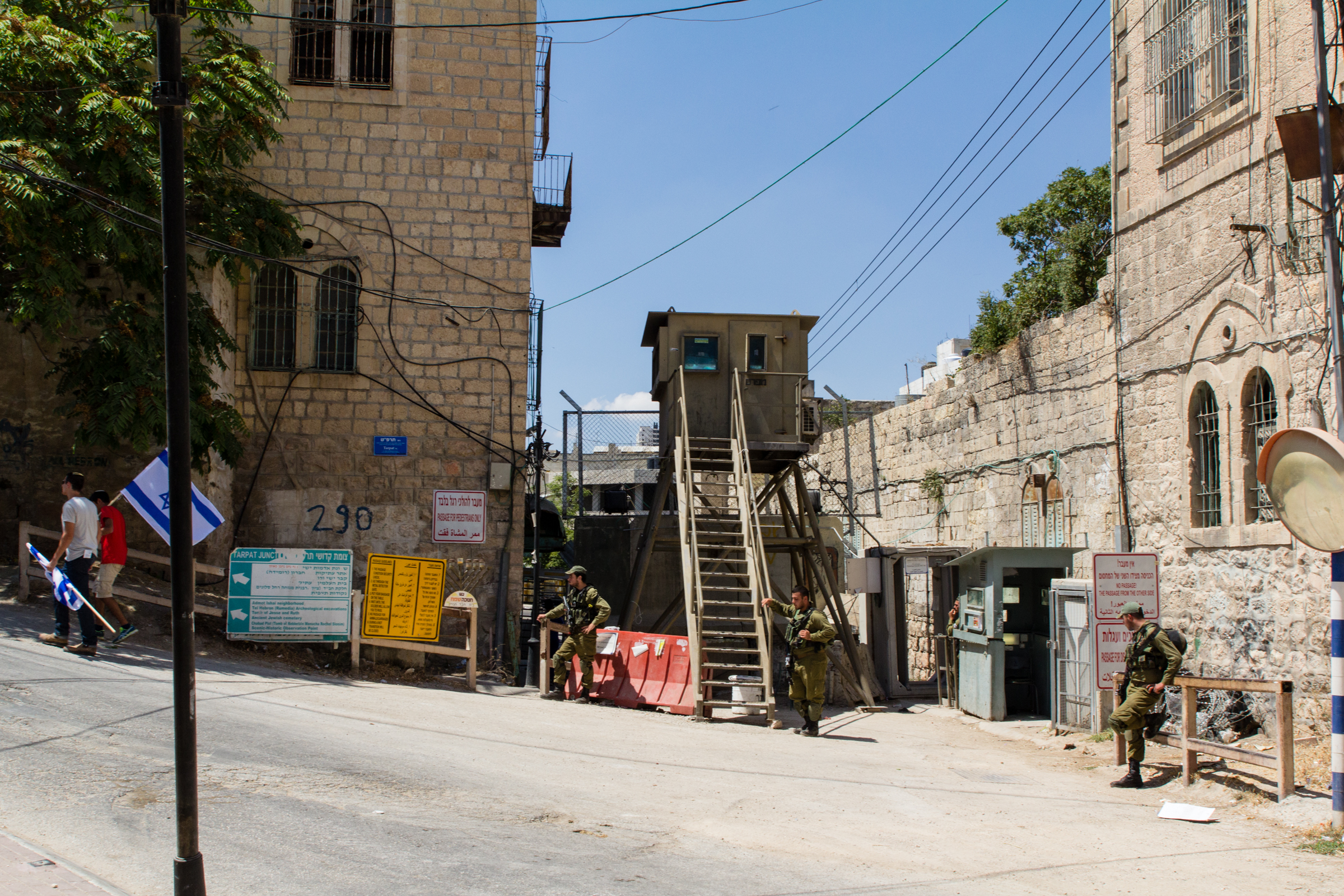
Israeli military checkpoint blocking al-Shuhada Street, August 28, 2015.

In December 2006, the IDF declared that Palestinian pedestrians had been refused entry for six years "by mistake". Previously having been stopped by soldiers, some Palestinians and activists were permitted access for 3 days. Stones were thrown at them by Jewish settler children, without being stopped by the accompanying policemen and soldiers. Instead, a 75-year-old volunteer was arrested, after she tried to prevent one of the soldiers from kicking one of her colleagues. Then, the street was declared a "closed military area" and entirely closed again, because ″there had been disturbances at that spot in the last few days″.

In February 2007, Haaretz reported that six settler families had been living in caravans in an IDF camp in Shuhada Street for more than ten years. An IDF spokesman said Israeli settlers were authorized to live in the site in the early 1990s. Dror Etkes of Peace Now described the situation as an "unhealthy coupling" that reflected the "growing distortion in the relations between the IDF and settlers".

In April 2007, under public pressure, and the night before the Supreme Court would hear the case, the Civil Administration issued temporary permits to some Palestinian occupants to re-use their main entrance on the street. Visitors were still denied use of these entrances. The army unsealed the welding on the front doors of homes. After August 2008, the permits were no longer renewed.

Currently, Palestinian shops are still prohibited in al-Shuhada Street, and Palestinian vehicles forbidden to enter. Palestinian pedestrians are subject to frequent rigorous control by Israeli soldiers at the many checkpoints in and around the street, and in some parts completely banned from entering.

== Violence against Palestinians ==
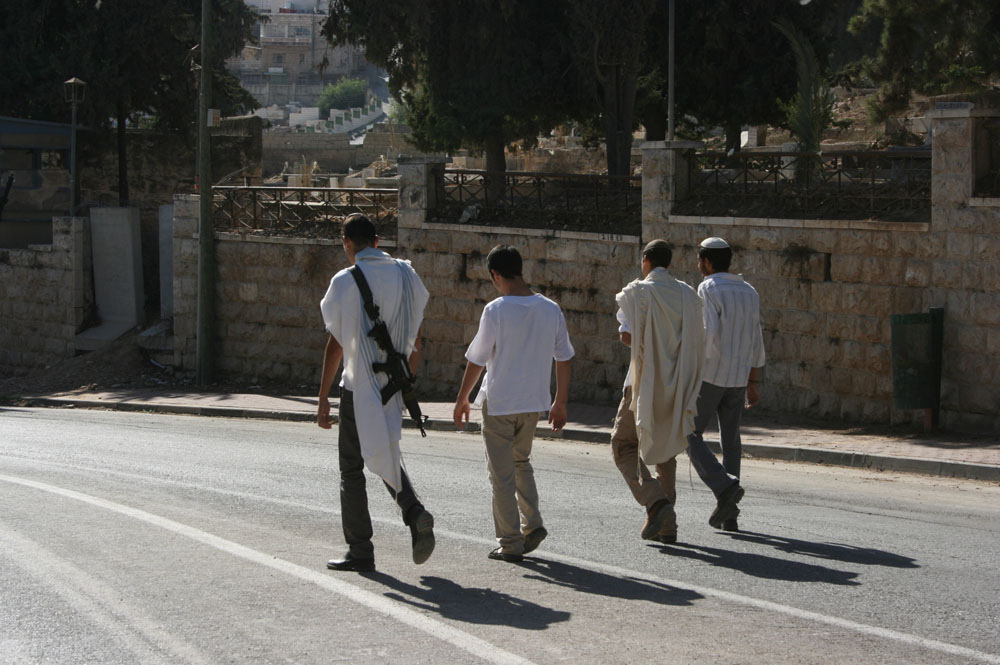
Armed Israeli settlers on Al-Shuhada Street, November 6, 2010.

In April 2014, as reported by Ma'an, Jewish settlers invaded the home of Palestinian inhabitants of Shuhada Street, beat the family, and wounded Zidan Sharbati. Israeli soldiers, who accompanied the settlers, arrested his brother Mofid, while Zidan was evacuated to a hospital.

Israeli photojournalist Rina Castelnuovo's photo for The New York Times showing a teenage settler throwing wine at a passing Palestinian woman before a Purim parade in Shuhada Street won 3rd prize in the General News category of the 2009 World Press Photo annual press photography contest.

On September 22, 2015, an 18-year-old Palestinian woman, Hadeel al-Hashlamon, was killed at Checkpoint 56 at Shuhada street by an Israeli soldier manning the checkpoint.

== Open Shuhada Street demonstrations ==
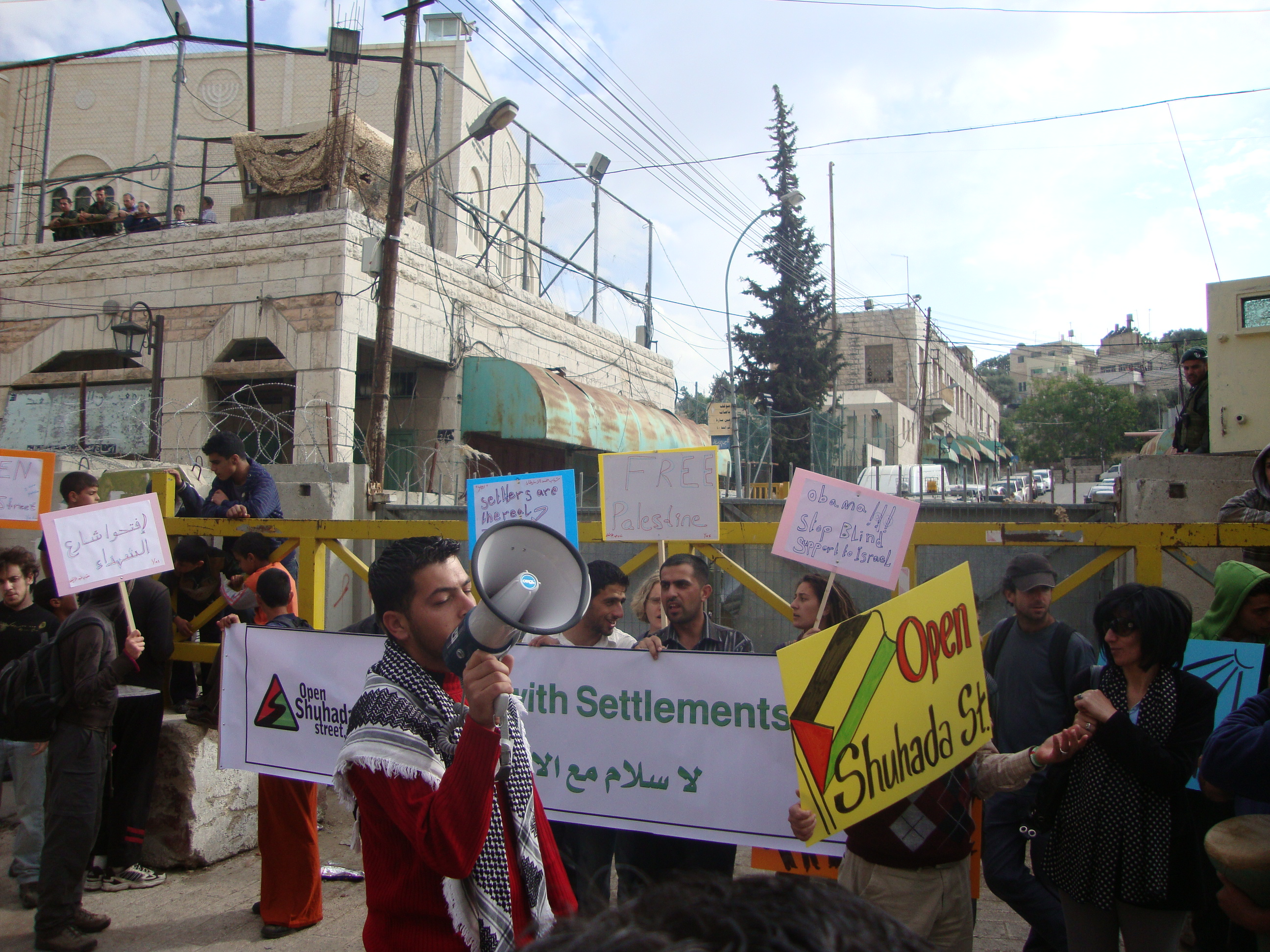
Open Shuhada Street demonstration in 2010

=== Annual Open Shuhada Street demonstrations ===
Every year, many demonstrations are held worldwide to call for the reopening to Palestinians of al-Shuhada Street. On the 25th of February 2010, which marks the anniversary of the 1994 massacre by Baruch Goldstein, the Palestinian group Youth Against Settlements led by activist Issa Amro organized the first demonstration of what would become the "Annual Open Shuhada Street Demonstration". They take place in Hebron, attended by Palestinians from all political parties, joined by Israeli and international activists.

==== First Annual Open Shuhada Street Demonstration ====
At the first demonstration on 25 February 2010, Hebron residents, Israeli activists and international volunteer groups were gathered, accompanied by press and political leaders. After just a few minutes, about 150 meters (yards) from the Shuhada Street checkpoint, the IDF reportedly attacked the peaceful demonstration with sound bombs and tear gas. Children were threatened with rifles.

==== Second Annual Open Shuhada Street Demonstration ====
At the second demonstration on 25 February 2011, the non-violent protestors were met with tear gas, sound grenades, and rubber bullets. Tear gas canisters were reportedly fired directly at the protestors. According to the organizers, 20 people were taken to hospital. One Israeli, two Palestinians, and three internationals were detained. Military sources only confirmed one arrest. The TIPH estimated that 1,500 people took part in the demonstrations.

==== Third Annual Open Shuhada Street Demonstration ====
At the third demonstration on 24 February 2012, estimated 8,000 Palestinians from across the West Bank, joined by solidarity activists, participated in the demonstration in Hebron. Six demonstrators were arrested. Many protesters were injured by tear gas.

==== Fourth Annual Open Shuhada Street Demonstration ====
At the fourth demonstration on 22 February 2013, the Israeli army sprayed the crowd with skunk water and threw stun grenades into the crowd. Dozens were wounded by rubber coated steel bullets or teargas. One journalist was hit in the leg.

==== Fifth Annual Open Shuhada Street Demonstration ====
At the fifth demonstration on 21 February 2014, according to AFP, about 1000 Palestinians together with Israeli and international activists marched to an Israeli military post on Shuhada Street from the Ali mosque. Israeli soldiers fired stun grenades and tear gas after the marchers refused to disperse. Some marchers were arrested for throwing stones and soldiers shot several people with rubber-coated steel bullets. The Israeli army said that they "used riot dispersal means" after "150 Palestinians violently crowded" the area. A cameraman for B’Tselem and a Palmedia journalist were, according to the organizers, shot in the head with rubber-coated steel bullets.

=== Weekly protests ===
Since April 2010, the group Youth Against Settlements has organized weekly non-violent demonstrations on Saturdays for the reopening to Palestinians of Shuhada Street, and for freedom of movement for all Palestinians in the Occupied Palestinian territories. Israeli, International and Palestinian demonstrators attended the demonstrations next to a closed entrance to Shuhada street and the Beit Romano settlement.

On 10 August 2010, the Israeli army responded to the peaceful weekly demonstrations with collective punishment by closure of Palestinian shops near the start location and sealing the doors, after earlier threats. Afterwards soldiers attacked and arrested people. They declared the area a “closed military zone” and threw, before leaving, a sound grenade amid the bystanders.

The weekly protests are part of many weekly demonstrations across Palestine, from which the protests in Bil'in internationally are well known from the documentary 5 Broken Cameras.

== See also ==
- Worshippers Way
