= Jerusalem Declaration on Christian Zionism =

2006 Palestinian Christian document critical of Christian Zionism

The Jerusalem Declaration on Christian Zionism is a joint statement issued by a number of Palestinian Christian churches dated 22 August 2006. It rejects Christian Zionism, concluding that it is a "false teaching that corrupts the biblical message of love, justice, and reconciliation."

The signatories of the Declaration were Patriarch Michel Sabbah, then Latin Patriarch of Jerusalem (a Catholic), Archbishop Swerios Malki Mourad, of the Syriac Orthodox Archdiocese of Jerusalem, Bishop Riah Abu El-Assal, then Anglican Bishop in Jerusalem of the Episcopal Church in Jerusalem and the Middle East, and Bishop Munib Younan, the Evangelical Lutheran Church in Jordan and the Holy Land.

Christian Zionists have responded to the Declaration.

== The Declaration ==
The Jerusalem Declaration begins with a quotation from Matthew 5:9, "Blessed are the peacemakers for they shall be called the children of God" and cites Micah 6:8, "What does the Lord require of you but to do justice, to love kindness, and to walk humbly with your God." Also, 2 Corinthians 5:19, "God was reconciling the world to himself in Christ, not counting sins against the sinners. He has entrusted to us the message of reconciliation."

Christian Zionism "embraces the most extreme ideological positions of Zionism, thereby becoming detrimental to a just peace within Palestine and Israel," according to the Declaration. A rabbi and professor writes, "Frequently, [Christian Zionists] are accused [by their critics] of blocking the way to peace in the Middle East."

Several reasons are given for opposition to Christian Zionism, among them the following. "The Christian Zionist programme provides a worldview where the Gospel is identified with the ideology of empire, colonialism and militarism. In its extreme form, it places an emphasis on apocalyptic events leading to the end of history rather than living Christ's love and justice today."

The Declaration is not against Zionism, as it does not challenge the reality of Israel's presence. "We affirm that Israelis and Palestinians are capable of living together within peace, justice and security." Yet it criticizes the one-sided political nature of Christian Zionism. It declares: "We call upon all people to reject the narrow world view of Christian Zionism and other ideologies that privilege one people at the expense of others."

The Declaration addresses all Christians:

"We call upon Christians in Churches on every continent to pray for the Palestinian and Israeli people, both of whom are suffering as victims of occupation and militarism. These discriminative actions are turning Palestine into impoverished ghettos surrounded by exclusive Israeli settlements. ¶ The establishment of the illegal settlements... on confiscated Palestinian land undermine the viability of a Palestinian state as well as peace and security in the entire region."

Although the Declaration does not oppose Zionism, affirming that "Israelis and Palestinians are capable of living together...", it condemns Christian Zionist support for the territorial expansion of Israel. "We are committed to non-violent resistance as the most effective means to end the illegal occupation in order to attain a just and lasting peace. ... ¶ God demands that justice be done."

== A Christian Zionist response ==
A Christian Zionist response to the Declaration has been posted, signed by three people representing Bridges for Peace, Christian Friends of Israel, and the International Christian Embassy in Jerusalem. No date is indicated, but it refers to the Jerusalem declaration as being a "recent statement". The response makes six points:

- A political position is taken, based on the Bible, applicable today. "God... gave the Land of Canaan to the Jewish people." Christian Zionists here deny that their doctrines constitute a Christian heresy.
- Christian Zionists hold that "Our Messiah and King, Jesus Christ, was born of Jewish parents, into a Jewish society, thus making the Jewish people our 'royal family' to be honored... ". Christian Zionists "reject the hatred of any people group [sic]."
- Christian Zionists "do not claim to know the sequence of events" when, according to the Bible, the world will come to an end.
- Based on the Bible, Christian Zionists recognize that Israel's national existence is regulated by "issues of justice and righteousness and treatment of the strangers in their midst".
- Christian Zionism "is not a threat to anybody, but instead seeks to be a blessing." They have given aid widely and "pray for peace". Yet Christian Zionists remain strongly adverse to Palestinian organizations which seek to destroy Israel. Christian Zionists portray the text of the Jerusalem Declaration as falsely describing the political "problem in the region" as simple.
- The proponents of the Jerusalem Declaration, whose views are considered "unbalanced" and "one-sided", are invited to dialogue. All Christians are called upon to pray for peace and for "Israel's right to live in peace and security, free from the threat of liquidation by Islamic Jihadists." The "Christian Zionist response" ends by stating, "We reject all forms of discrimination."

This response does not claim to speak for all Christian Zionists. For example, Rev. Pat Robertson, a leading Christian Zionist, on principle condemned Palestinians if they challenge Israel's exclusive right to all of the land. Robertson, in fact, attacked even leading Israeli politicians if they negotiated land for peace.

=== Recent changes ===
The number of people claiming some connection to Christian Zionism has grown during the last decades, recently surging to increase many fold. Most of these recent additional supporters evidently take a more "sophisticated" view, and reject or ignore the original theology of Christian Zionism with its dark apocalyptic scenarios of death and destruction during the "end times" of planet earth predicted for the near future. Instead, these millions of new Christian adherents simply support Israel, spiritually and/or politically, and view Christian Zionism as a vehicle by which to express their friendship and affection for the Jewish people living there. Accordingly, some of the Declaration's characterization of Christian Zionism may no longer apply to the new majority of those who claim it.

== See also ==
- Sabeel Ecumenical Liberation Theology Center
- Christian Zionism: "Disapproval by other Churches"
- Churches for Middle East Peace

== Bibliography ==
- Naim Ateek, Cedar Duaybis, and Maurine Tobin, editors, Challenging Christian Zionism. Theology, politics, and the Israel-Palestine conflict (London: Melisende 2005).
- David Brog, Standing with Israel. Why Christians support the Jewish state (Lake Mary, Florida: Front Line 2006)
- Edmond Lee Browning, "Faith as the Solution", in Ateek et al. (2005).
- Caitlin Carenen, The Fervent Embrace. Liberal Protestants, Evangelicals, and Israel (New York University 2012).
- Dan Cohn-Sherbok, The Politics of Apocalypse. The history and influence of Christian Zionism (Oxford: Oneworld 2006).
- Clifford A. Kiracofe, Dark Crusade. Christian Zionism and US Foreign Policy (London: I. B. Tauris 2009)
- Grace Halsell, "Israeli Extremists and Christian Fundamentalists: The Alliance" in Washington Report, December 1988.
- Hal Lindsey, The Late, Great Planet Earth (Grand Rapids: Zondervan 1970; reprint: Lakeland, London).
