= Youth Against Settlements =

Palestinian activist group

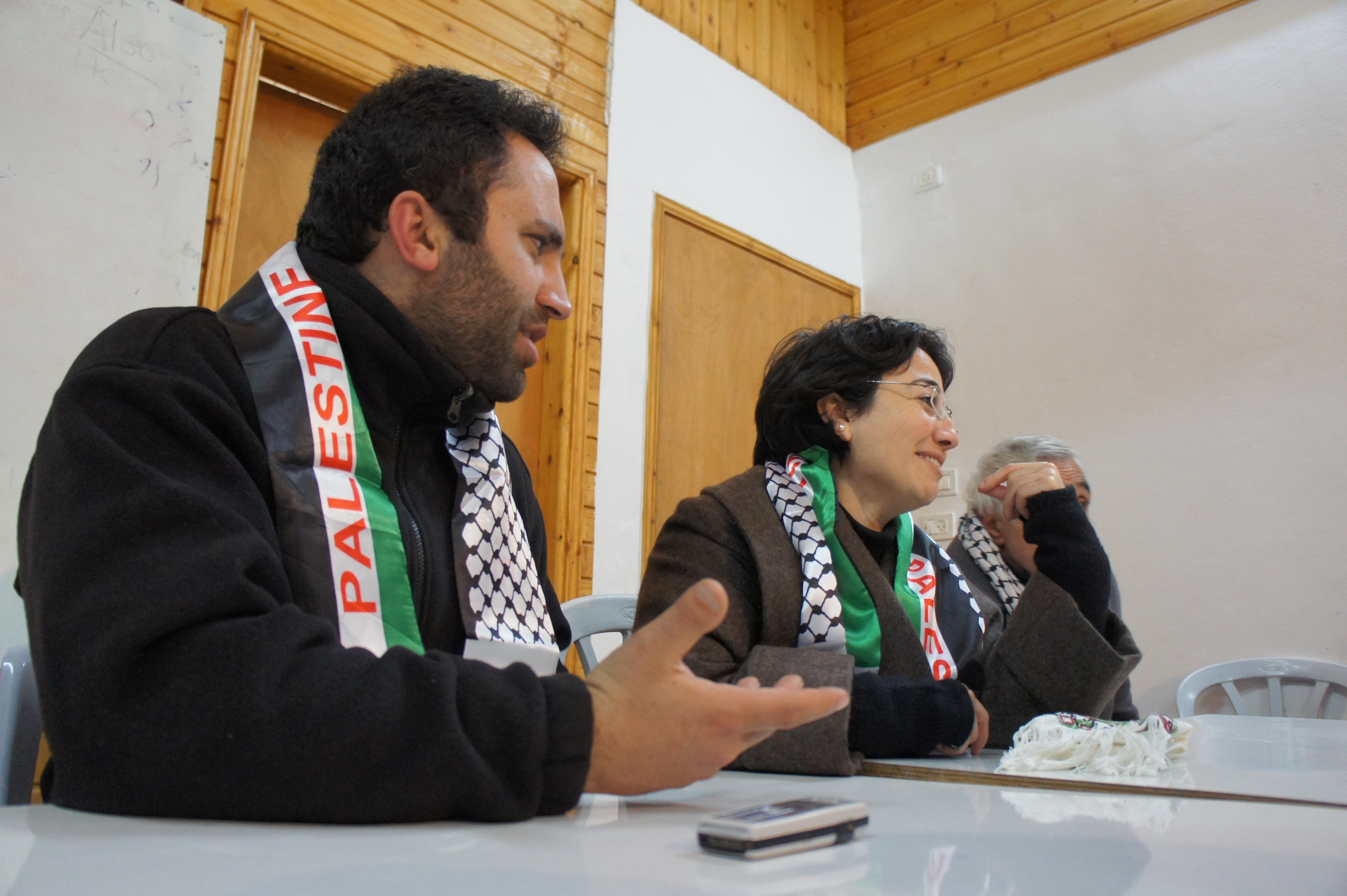
- Established: 2008 (18 years ago)
- Types: advocacy group
- Headquarters: Hebron
- Country: Palestine

Youth against Settlements (YAS; Arabic: شباب ضد المستوطنات) is a non-violent Palestinian activist group based in Hebron. YAS organizes peaceful actions against the Israeli occupation of Palestine through non-violent popular struggle and civil disobedience.

The group is represented as NGO in the United Nations Human Rights Council.

== Organization ==
Since 2012, Youth against Settlements has been coordinated by Issa Amro. In March 2014, Amro gave a presentation at the United Nations Human Rights Council (UNHRC) in Geneva.

In October 2024, Amro and YAS were distinguished with the Swedish Right Livelihood Award, "for their steadfast nonviolent resistance to Israel’s illegal occupation, promoting Palestinian civic action through peaceful means."

== Activities ==
Youth Against Settlements (YAS) has been leading the Open Shuhada Street Campaign (OSC), a global campaign to re-open Shuhada Street. Besides the international Annual Open Shuhada Street demonstrations, YAS also organizes the weekly protests throughout the Occupied Palestinian territories. In May 2012, Akram Natsheh spoke at a United Nations International Meeting in Paris.

During the spate of violence in late 2015, YAS activist Sohaib Zahda published an editorial in the International Business Times criticising the ongoing occupation of Palestine as the cause of the violence, as well as the complicity of the Palestinian Authority with Israel.

In 2012, Amro was arrested and detained 20 times, and in 2013 until August 6 times. In August 2013, United Nations independent human rights experts expressed deep concern at actions directed against Amro. Right before the session, which was attended by Amro, Israel sent a summon for him to appear at a Military Court on 30 December 2013, without indication of any charges. On 8 July 2013, the month before the UN meeting, Israeli soldiers took away his identity documents. He was tortured by soldiers and ended up in a hospital.
