= Braco =

Braco may refer to:

== Places ==
- Braco, Perth and Kinross, a village in Scotland
- Braco Airfield, an airstrip in Jamaica

== People ==
- Braco (faith healer) (born 1967), self-styled healer from Croatia
- Baron Braco, a title in the Peerage of Ireland
- Braco Dimitrijević (born 1948), Paris-based Bosnian and Yugoslavian artist
- Celestino Aós Braco (born 1945), Spanish-born prelate of the Catholic Church
- Lorraine Braco (born 1954), American film and television actress
- Vincent Braco (1835-1889), Italian prelate of the Catholic Church

== Fictional characters ==
- Braco, a character in the animated series Adventure Time

== See also ==
- Bracco (disambiguation)
- Bracho (disambiguation)
- Brako (disambiguation)
