= Patriarchate =

Jurisdiction and office of an ecclesiastical patriarch

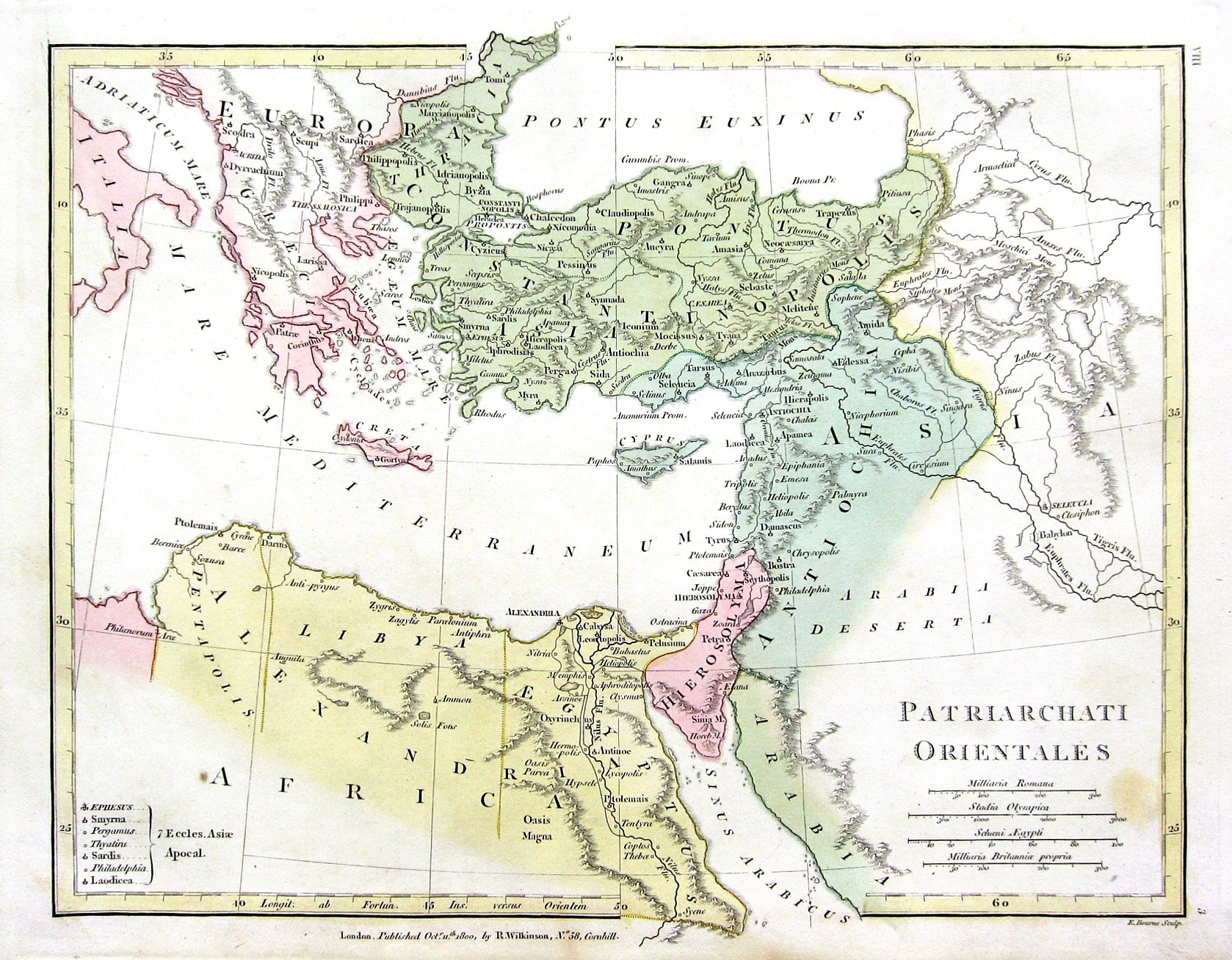
Eastern patriarchates of the Pentarchy, after the Council of Chalcedon (451)

Patriarchate (/ˈpeɪtriɑːrkɪt, -keɪt/, UK also /ˈpætri-/; Ancient Greek: πατριαρχεῖον, patriarcheîon) is an ecclesiological term in Christianity, referring to the office and jurisdiction of a patriarch.

According to Christian tradition, three patriarchates—Rome, Antioch and Alexandria—were established by the apostles as apostolic sees in the 1st century. These were officially recognized by the First Council of Nicaea. The Patriarchate of Constantinople was added in the 4th century, and the Patriarchate of Jerusalem followed in the 5th century. These five sees were later recognized collectively as the pentarchy, by the Council of Chalcedon in 451.

Over the course of Christian history, additional patriarchates were gradually recognized by the original ancient episcopal sees. However, several of these later lost jurisdiction—primarily due to the Islamic conquests in the Middle East and North Africa—and became titular or honorary patriarchates, without real institutional authority over their historical territories.

== History ==
As Christianity expanded throughout the Roman Empire, concentrations of believers were increasingly found in urban centers. Bishops in these cities came to hold pre-eminence in the province where their diocese was located, especially if the city was the provincial capital. Over time, some bishops attained authority beyond their province, becoming recognized as primus inter pares. The Council of Nicea formalized this structure into canon law, following secular Roman administrative patterns. It also introduced the term "Metropolitan" to describe bishops who presided over multiple dioceses within a province.

By the 4th century, cities such as Rome, Alexandria, and Antioch had extended their ecclesiastical authority beyond a single province. For instance, Alexandria held jurisdiction over Roman Egypt, Roman Libya and the Pentapolis, while Rome exercised primatial authority over surrounding provinces within 100 miles (129 km) of the city. By virtue of this multi-provincial oversight, the sees of Rome, Alexandria and Antioch were already exercising a "supra-metropolitan" jurisdiction, later termed as Patriarchates. By the end of the 4th century, all of Italy had come under the broader primatial jurisdiction of the Archbishop of Rome.

After the Imperial capital moved to Byzantium in 330, the renamed city of Constantinople grew in prominence within the Eastern Church. It was granted archiepiscopal status before the Council of 381, which ranked it second in honor after Rome. Archbishop Atticus expanded the jurisdiction of the see in the early 5th century.

Following the Council of Ephesus in 431, Bishop Juvenal of Jerusalem sought to extend his oversight across all three provinces of Roman Palestine, aiming to elevate Jerusalem to a Metropolitan See. This move was opposed by Cyril of Alexandria and Pope Leo I, who argued against separating Jerusalem from the authority of Antioch. Juvenal later claimed metropolitan authority over Roman Arabia and Phoenicia. At the Council of Chalcedon, negotiations with Archbishop Maximus of Antioch led to approval for Jerusalem's oversight over all of Palestine, but not beyond. The council recognized Jerusalem as a Metropolitanate, elevating it alongside the sees of: Rome, Constantinople, Alexandria and Antioch. Emperor Justinian would later recognize Jerusalem as one of the five official Patriarchates.

The East–West Schism of 1054 separated the Latin Church’s See of Rome from the Byzantine patriarchates of the East, resulting in the formation of the modern Catholic Church and Eastern Orthodox Church.

Today, the four Eastern Orthodox patriarchates—Constantinople, Alexandria, Antioch and Jerusalem—alongside their Western counterpart, Rome, are regarded as "senior" (Greek: πρεσβυγενή, presbygenē, "senior-born") or "ancient" (παλαίφατα, palèphata, "of ancient fame") patriarchates. These are considered apostolic sees, each traditionally founded by one of the apostles or evangelists: Andrew, Mark, Peter, James and Peter again, respectively.

In the case of Constantinople, Andrew is said to have visited the earlier city of Byzantium in 38 AD (prior to its renaming by Constantine the Great in 330 AD). According to tradition, he appointed Stachys the Apostle as bishop, who remained in office until 54 AD. Therefore, the apostolic heritage of Constantinople is attributed to the original See of Byzantium.

== Catholic Church ==
Within the Catholic Church, six of the Eastern Catholic Churches sui iuris are led by a patriarch. These are the heads of the Coptic Catholic Church (Patriarchate of Alexandria), the Maronite Church, the Melkite Greek Catholic Church, the Syriac Catholic Church (each using the title Patriarch of Antioch), the Chaldean Catholic Church (Patriarchate of Baghdad) and the Armenian Catholic Church (Patriarchate of Cilicia). All the eastern patriarchates are "equal in ... dignity", regardless of their antiquity.

The Pope, as Bishop of Rome and Supreme Pontiff, leads the Latin Church and holds supreme authority over the entire Catholic Church. While Pope Francis reinstated the historical title "Patriarch of the West" in 2024, it had been officially dropped by Pope Benedict XVI in 2006 and is not commonly used to describe the Pope's role within the Latin Church.

There are also four major archbishops, each heading an Eastern Catholic church sui iuris without a patriarchal title, namely the Ukrainian Greek Catholic, Syro-Malabar, Syro-Malankara and Romanian Greek Catholic churches. Although they rank just below patriarchs in precedence, major archbishops hold similar authority within their churches. A key procedural difference is that patriarchs request ecclesiastica communio (ecclesiastical communion) from the Pope following their election and enthronement, while a major archbishop's election requires papal confirmation before enthronement.

In the Latin Church, there are four titular patriarchates, i.e. historical archdioceses where the archbishop holds the honorary title of patriarch. This title grants ceremonial precedence but no jurisdiction beyond the archdiocese (except in the case of Jerusalem, which retains territorial jurisdiction). These are the Latin Patriarchate of Jerusalem, the Patriarchate of Lisbon, the Patriarchate of Venice and the Patriarchate of the East Indies.

It is not uncommon for the various Eastern Catholic patriarchates and the Latin Church to have overlapping jurisdictions, particularly in the Middle East and diaspora regions. For example, among the three patriarchates of Antioch:

- the Melkite Patriarch is based in Damascus, Syria;
- the Maronite Patriarch resides in Bkerké, Lebanon; and
- the Syriac Catholic Patriarch is based in Beirut, Lebanon.

== Eastern Orthodox Church ==
Nine of the current autocephalous Eastern Orthodox churches—among them the four ancient churches of Constantinople, Alexandria, Antioch, and Jerusalem—are organized as patriarchates. In chronological order of establishment, the other five patriarchates are: the Bulgarian Patriarchate (the first to be founded after the Pentarchy), the Georgian Patriarchate, the Serbian Patriarchate, the Moscow Patriarchate and the Romanian Patriarchate.

The Greek Orthodox Patriarchate of Antioch relocated its headquarters to Damascus in the 13th century, during the period of Mamluk rule over Syria. Although a Christian community had existed in Damascus since apostolic times (Acts 9), the see continues to be known as the Patriarchate of Antioch.

In certain legal jurisdictions, a patriarchate is considered to have legal personality, meaning it is recognized similarly to a corporation. For example, in 1999, the Greek Orthodox Patriarchate of Jerusalem filed a lawsuit in New York against Christie's Auction House, disputing the ownership of the Archimedes Palimpsest.

== Oriental Orthodoxy ==
Several patriarchates exist within the Oriental Orthodox Churches. These include four ancient sees: the Coptic Orthodox Church (Alexandria), the Syriac Orthodox Church (Antioch), and two Armenian patriarchates—one based in Jerusalem (Armenian Patriarchate of Jerusalem) and the other in Constantinople (Armenian Patriarchate of Constantinople).

In addition to these, two modern patriarchates have been established: the Ethiopian Orthodox Tewahedo Church and the Eritrean Orthodox Tewahedo Church.

There are also several autocephalous churches that function similarly to patriarchates, even though they do not use the patriarchal title. These include: the Malankara Orthodox Syrian Church, the Mother See of Holy Etchmiadzin (Armenian Catholicosate of Etchmiadzin) and the Holy See of Cilicia (Armenian Catholicosate of Cilicia).

== Church of the East ==
Patriarch of the Church of the East is the head of the Church of the East. Today, there are three rival patriarchs:

- Catholicos-Patriarch of the Assyrian Church of the East
- Catholicos Patriarch of the Ancient Church of the East
- Chaldean Catholic patriarch of Baghdad (of the Catholic church)

== Protestantism ==
The head of the Czechoslovak Hussite Church is also called a patriarch.

== See also ==
- Holy See
- Patriarch of Alexandria
- Patriarch of Antioch

== Sources ==
- Erickson, John H. (1991). The Challenge of Our Past: Studies in Orthodox Canon Law and Church History. Crestwood, NY: St. Vladimir's Seminary Press. ISBN 9780881410860.
- Kiminas, Demetrius (2009). The Ecumenical Patriarchate: A History of Its Metropolitanates with Annotated Hierarch Catalogs. Wildside Press LLC. ISBN 9781434458766.
- Meyendorff, John (1989). Imperial unity and Christian divisions: The Church 450-680 A.D. The Church in history. Vol. 2. Crestwood, NY: St. Vladimir's Seminary Press. ISBN 9780881410563.
- Meyendorff, John (1996). Rome, Constantinople, Moscow: Historical and Theological Studies. Crestwood, NY: St. Vladimir's Seminary Press. ISBN 9780881411348.
- Nedungatt, George, ed. (2002). A Guide to the Eastern Code: A Commentary on the Code of Canons of the Eastern Churches. Rome: Oriental Institute Press. ISBN 9788872103364.
- Pheidas, Blasios I. (2005). "Papal Primacy and Patriarchal Pentarchy in the Orthodox Tradition". The Petrine Ministry: Catholics and Orthodox in Dialogue. New York: The Newman Press. ISBN 9780809143344.
- Runciman, Steven (1985). The Great Church in captivity: A study of the Patriarchate of Constantinople from the eve of the Turkish conquest to the Greek War of Independence. Cambridge University Press. ISBN 9780521313100.
