= Pontifical Oriental Institute =

Catholic university in Rome

Coordinates: 41°53′50″N 12°29′59″E

- Type: Pontifical institute
- Established: 1917; 109 years ago
- Founders: Pope Benedict XV
- Academic affiliations: Gregorian University
- Chancellor: Leonardo Sandri
- Rector: Rev. David Nazar, S.J.
- Postgraduates: 350
- Location: Piazza of St. Mary Major, 7; 00185 Rome, Italy
- Website: Orientale
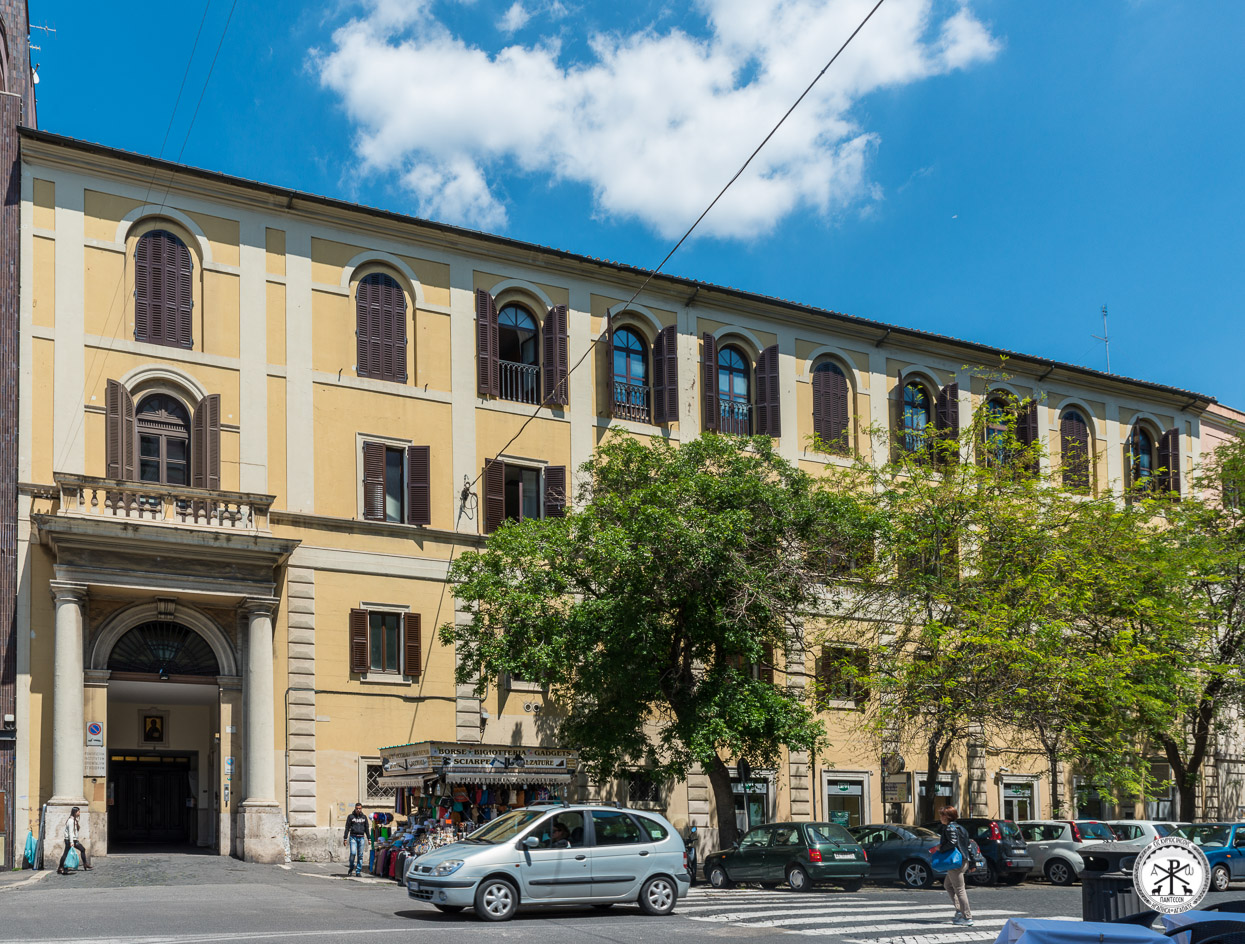

The Pontifical Oriental Institute, also known as the Orientale, is a Catholic institution of higher education located in Rome and focusing on Eastern Christianity.

The plan of creating a school of higher learning for Eastern Christianity had been on the agenda of the Catholic Church since at least Pope Leo XIII, but it was only realized in 1917 by Pope Benedict XV. The Orientale forms part of the consortium of the Pontifical Gregorian University (founded in 1551) and the Pontifical Biblical Institute (founded in 1909), both in Rome. All three institutions are run by the Society of Jesus (Jesuits).

While the Orientale depends on the Holy See, its management is entrusted to the Society of Jesus. Its chancellor is the Prefect of the Congregation for the Eastern Churches and its vice-chancellor is the superior general of the Society of Jesus, while the Congregation for Catholic Education is the dicastery competent for approving the academic programmes of the Orientale. Each year, another approximately 400 scholars visit the library for research purposes.

The Institute has been incorporated along with the Pontifical Biblical Institute into the Pontifical Gregorian University under a single rector, as of 19 May 2024, when new statutes of the Gregorian take effect.

== Mission ==
The Pontifical Oriental Institute is a school of higher studies that has as its particular mission the service of the Oriental Churches. It is to make known to the churches of the East “the immense richness ... preserved in the treasure chests of their traditions” (GP II, Orientale Lumen 4) and equally to make known to the Latin West these riches so little explored. Its mission is to pursue research, teaching, and publishing related to the traditions of the Eastern Churches in their theology, liturgy, patristics, history, canon law, literature and languages, spirituality, archaeology, and questions of ecumenical and geopolitical importance.

The aim of the Orientale is to educate students already in possession of a first academic degree, irrespective of their religious affiliation, Latin or Eastern Catholic, Orthodox or otherwise, to deepen their knowledge of the Christian East in its Churches, theology, spirituality, liturgy, discipline, history, and culture. The student population comes largely from the countries of the Eastern churches: the Middle East, Eastern Europe, Africa (Egypt, Ethiopia, and Eritrea), and Asia (Mesopotamia; Kerala, India), with a significant number of students from Europe and the Americas interested in learning about the Christian East. Today, with the flood of migrants and refugees from some of the above countries, students also come from the diaspora communities.

== History ==
=== The early years ===
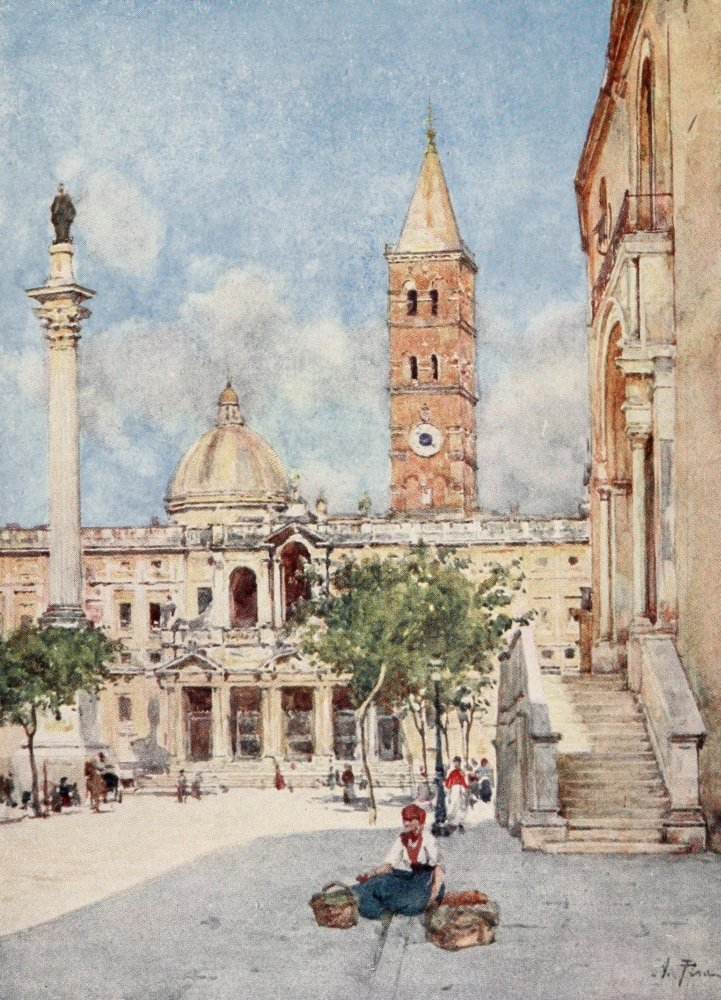
Santa Maria Maggiore by Alberta Pisa (1905)

The Orientale’s first provisional seat was in the immediate vicinity of the Vatican, in the Palazzo dei Convertendi, Piazza Scossacavalli, which later had to give way to Via della Conciliazione. The Institute was briefly re-located to the current premises of the Pontifical Biblical Institute, in via della Pilotta, 25, Rome until 1926 when it settled into its permanent seat at Piazza di Santa Maria Maggiore, 7. Of all churches in Rome, the Basilica of St. Mary Major in the same square is the one which evokes the East most closely. Its famous mosaics were executed under Pope Sixtus III (432-440) to celebrate the third ecumenical council of Ephesus (431), which, by emphasizing that Jesus Christ is one person, brought out as a consequence that Mary, his Mother, is the Mother of God, or the Theotokos, as the Greeks call her. As the Basilica prides itself on having the relics of the crib, it is thus liturgically known as “ad Praesepe”, the Church of the Crib. Here, moreover, in the late 860s the apostles of the Slavs, Saints Cyril and Methodius, deposited their liturgy books, an indication that now, after the pope’s approval, one could celebrate the liturgy in Church Slavonic. In a side street opposite against the Orientale there is the Basilica of Santa Prassede, with its Carolingian mosaics attesting Pope St Pascal I’s revulsion against the iconoclasm which at the time of the construction of the Basilica (817) had resumed in the East. Nearby, there is a marble slab reminding us that St Cyril, St Methodius’ brother, died there in 869. As part of the complex of the block where the Orientale is there is the church of St. Anthony the Great (S. Antonio Abate), of whom all Easterners are particularly fond. He is also popular in Rome, where people still recall the times when the blessing of the animals took place in this church. Ever since the creation of the Pontifical Russian College in 1929, known as the Russicum, by Pius XI (1921-1939), the church has been run by Jesuits living in the college. In many ways, therefore, the position of the Orientale is ideal.

=== The first 100 years ===
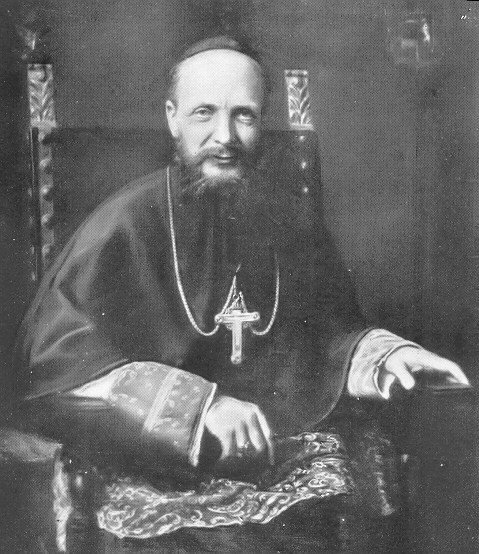
Mgr Michel d'Herbigny, Bishop and Rector of the Pontifical Oriental Institute (Rome)

The Orientale was created as a twin institution to the Congregation for the Eastern Church, whose name would change in 1967 to Congregation for the Eastern Churches. Without the link to this important organ of the Holy See, it would be impossible to grasp the purpose and mission of the Orientale, nor how the Orientale could be founded in the midst of the "useless massacre" of World War I, 1917. The question to which the creation of the Orientale was meant to be the answer had been long in coming. Known as la question d’Orient, the question was first posed after the Ottoman’s humiliating defeat at the hands of the Russians in 1774 (cf. the Treaty of Kutchuk-Kainarji), becoming ever more poignant ever since Napoleon set foot in Egypt in 1798: what was to be done with the millions of Christians under the Ottomans once the Ottoman empire would disappear? The question reached its acme in the Eucharistic Congress of Jerusalem in 1893, when the Eastern Catholic Patriarchs made the grievances of their communities known to the papal legate, Cardinal Benoît Langenieux, who forwarded them to the pope. Leo XIII at once convoked an assembly of Eastern Catholic Patriarchs for the following year (1894), from which emerged the apostolic letter Orientalium dignitas, known as the Magna Carta of the rights of Eastern Catholics. With the collapse of the Russian empire a reality after the February revolution of 1917 and the demise of the Ottoman empire in sight, the pope decided to act. With the motu proprio regarding the Eastern Congregation, Providentis Dei (1.05.1917), the pope created the Oriental Congregation; with the other motu proprio Orientis catholici(15.10.1917), he created the Orientale. The pope reserved to himself the prefecture of the new Congregation, whose head was therefore only a Secretary, although a cardinal (cfr. canon 257 of the Pio-Benedictine Codex Iuris canonici of 1917 specified precisely this). Already three years after founding the Orientale, Benedict XV granted it, through the apostolic constitution, Quod nobis in condendo, the right to confer degrees. From the start the pope insisted on the necessity of a richly supplied Eastern library to second the study and the research of the Orientale population.

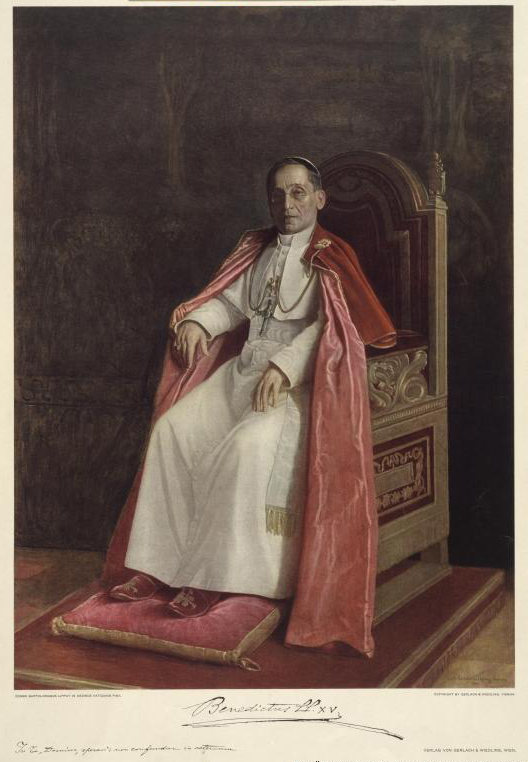
Pope Benedict XV

At the beginning the professors were chosen from various orders and even among lay people. These were a White Father, Antoine Delpuch (1868-1936), who served as pro-president in the first year of the Orientale's functioning (1918-1919); two Benedictines, including Ildefonso Schuster; three Assumptionists, including Martin Jugie (1878-1954), a professor at the Orientale for only the first few years, but who was to write a monumental synthesis of the history of Eastern theology; a Dominican; a Mechitarist; four Jesuits, including Guillaume de Jerphanion (1877-1948), a famous archaeologist; two Russians, a Greek and an Ethiopian; and three lay persons, including Michelangelo Guidi, an outstanding philologist and a historian.

Soon after Pius XI became pope he felt that it would be better if one order took care not only of running the place but also of preparing those who could eventually take over. His choice fell on the Jesuits, and in a brief to Fr. General Vladimir Ledochowski (14.09.1922) he entrusted to the Order the Orientale. This had been the suggestion of Abbot Alfredo Ildefonso Schuster, OSB, who had also become, in the meantime, the first full president. Now it was the turn of the first Jesuit president (1922-1931), and that was Michel d'Herbigny (1880-1957). A very talented man, he managed to impart to the nascent institution new élan, with its own publications and even the new seat in the Piazza di Santa Maria Maggiore. Complications on his very delicate mission to Russia led to his early retirement. D’Herbigny was followed as president by Emil Hermann (1932-1951), a German canon lawyer of note, whose prudence helped him guide the Institute during the war period; Ignacio Ortiz de Urbina (1951-1957), a Basque and a renowned patristic scholar; Alphonse Raes (1957-1962), an accomplished Syriac scholar who became Prefect of the Vatican Library; Joseph Gill (1962-1963), a great expert on the Council of Florence (1438-1445) and chief editor of the Acts of this council; and again Joseph Gill (1964-1967), who in 1965 began to bear the title of Jesuit Rector; Ivan Žužek (1967-1972), later the secretary of the Pontifical Commission for the revision of Eastern canon law; Georges Dejaifve (1972-1976), noted ecumenist; Eduard Huber (1976-1981), former rector of the Meudon School of Russian; Peter-Hans Kolvenbach (1981-1983), who after a brief stint became Superior general of the Society of Jesus for a quarter of a century (1983-2008); Gilles Pelland (1984-1986), who was soon made rector of the Gregorian University; Gino Piovesana (1986-1990), whose experience as rector of the Sophia University of Tokyo and his expertise in Russian philosophy stood him in good stead; Clarence Gallagher (1990-1995), a canon lawyer, dean and rector; Gilles Pelland (1995-1998), the only rector to have two different terms separated in time; Hèctor Vall Vilardell (1998-2007), whose aplomb assured him nine years as rector; Cyril Vasil' (2007-2009), who after two years became Secretary of the Congregation; Sunny Kokkaravalayil (May 2009-May 2010), who was pro-rector for a year and superior for seven; James McCann (2010-2015), who after leaving office became Senior Vice President of the Gregorian Foundation, New York; Samir Khalil Samir, who was pro-rector from 20 April 2015 to 25 August 2015, and David Nazar (2015-), in whose term the Orientale was not only re-structured but also became fused, as a community, with the adjoining community of the Pontifical Russian College, popularly known as Russicum.

The hundred year history of the institution (1917-2017) may tentatively be divided, first, into an eleven year period at the beginning, when the Orientale was trying to assert itself and become recognized, which came with Pius XI’s encyclical dedicated to the Orientale, Rerum orientalium (1928). Then followed a thirty-year period bringing us to the eve of Vatican II (1928-1958), when already some of the rich harvest that was expected began to be reaped, and the foundations for others to build on had been laid. Yet the next thirty years after the council up to 1989, the fresh breath of Vatican II brought accrued interest in the Christian East and in the Orientale. When with 1989 Eastern Europe opened up, a new chapter of the Orientale’s relating to the hitherto forbidden East started and many new students from these countries could now study at the Orientale.

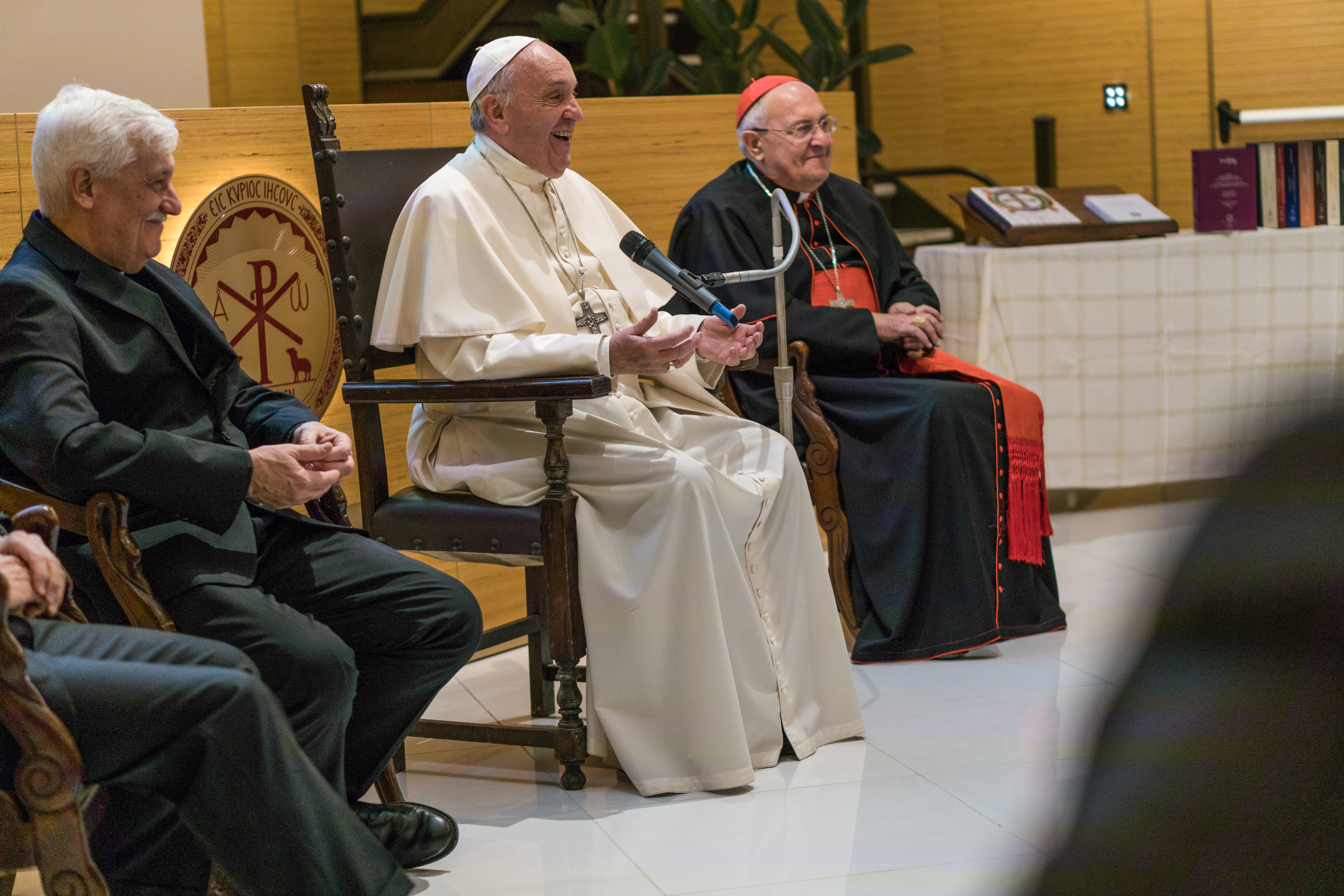
Pope Francis visit to the Orientale in 2017. Cardinal Leonardo Sandri to his left. The Very Reverend Arturo Sosa, SJ, Superior General of the Society of Jesus (Jesuits) to his right.

== The library ==
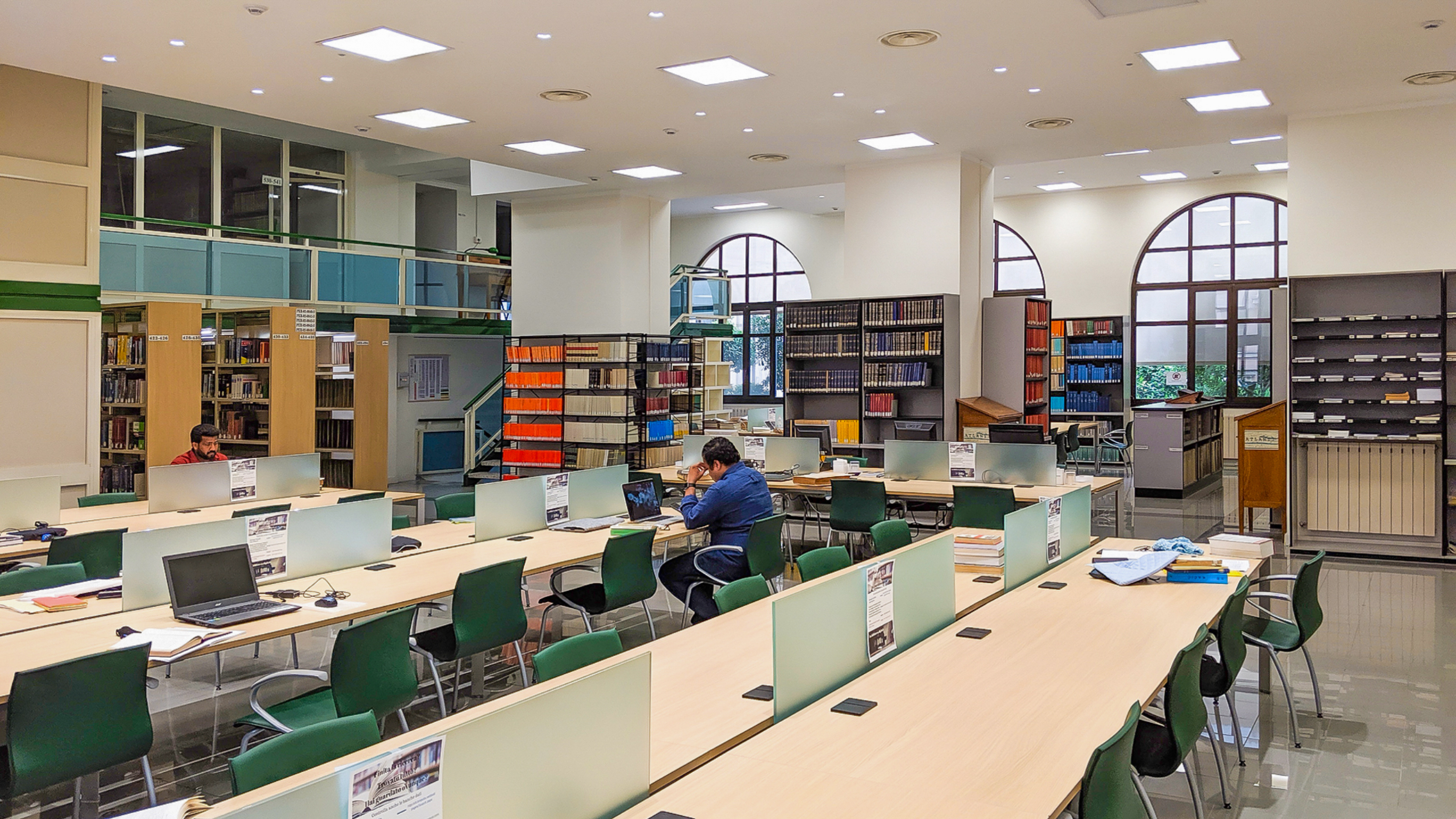
Students working in the library

The Pontifical Library of the Institute is without a doubt the greatest gem of the Orientale. It is one of the best equipped libraries regarding the Christian East in the world. Some books which were discarded during the early years of the Soviet Union were bought for the Orientale Library, such that it alone has the entire Pravda collection, for example. The library space was considerably enlarged by John Paul II after his visit to the Orientale in 1987. The "aula magna", a conference hall which hosts part of the library and was re-furbished for the centenary celebrations in 2017, provides a "safe space" for international discussions on problematic yet delicate themes. Syria, autocephaly, genocide, nonviolence, are some of the themes to which imams, diplomats, Patriarchs, Cardinals, and "people on the ground" have participated.

== Academics ==
=== Faculties and languages ===
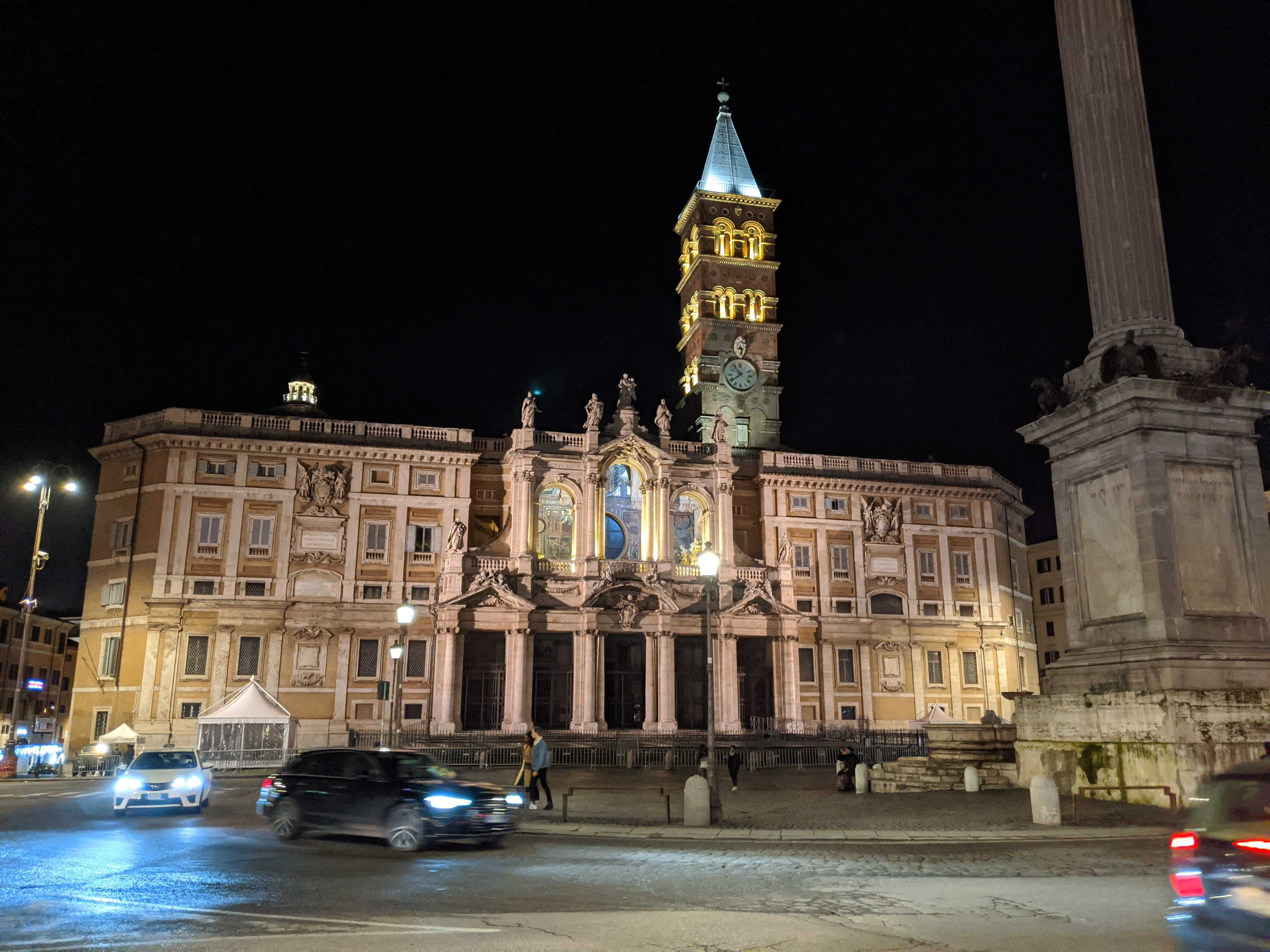
The Papal Basilica of Saint Mary Major, which shares the square with the Pontifical Oriental Institute

As an Institute, the Orientale has only two faculties, one for ecclesiastical sciences, the other for Eastern canon law. At first there was only one faculty, and it comprised the programme already outlined in Benedict XV's founding charter (1917), that is theology, comprising spirituality, liturgy, and canon law, plus archaeology and such subsidiary sciences as are necessary to secure a balanced programme of societal structures, art, culture, history. In this curriculum, languages play a major part, and, besides Italian which is the main teaching language, ancient Greek, Syriac, Russian, and Church Slavonic, have always loomed large. Besides Armenian, Coptic, Ethiopic, and Georgian, which have become part and parcel of the curriculum, in recent years modern Greek and Romanian have been added. Modern Greek is divided into four levels, whereby one may obtain a diploma from the Greek government. For canon law students, Latin is required and taught. A well-developed Italian language programme has become the hard core of the propaedeutic year.

Branching off from the Faculty of Eastern Ecclesial Sciences, the faculty of canon law was created in 1971, partly in view of the revision of Eastern canon law and a corresponding codex. Secretary of this commission was Fr. Ivan Žužek (1924-2004). The Orientale, with its professors of canon law, continues to serve as the main centre for the elaboration of the Code which is used around the world by both Catholic and Orthodox churches of the East.

=== Publications ===
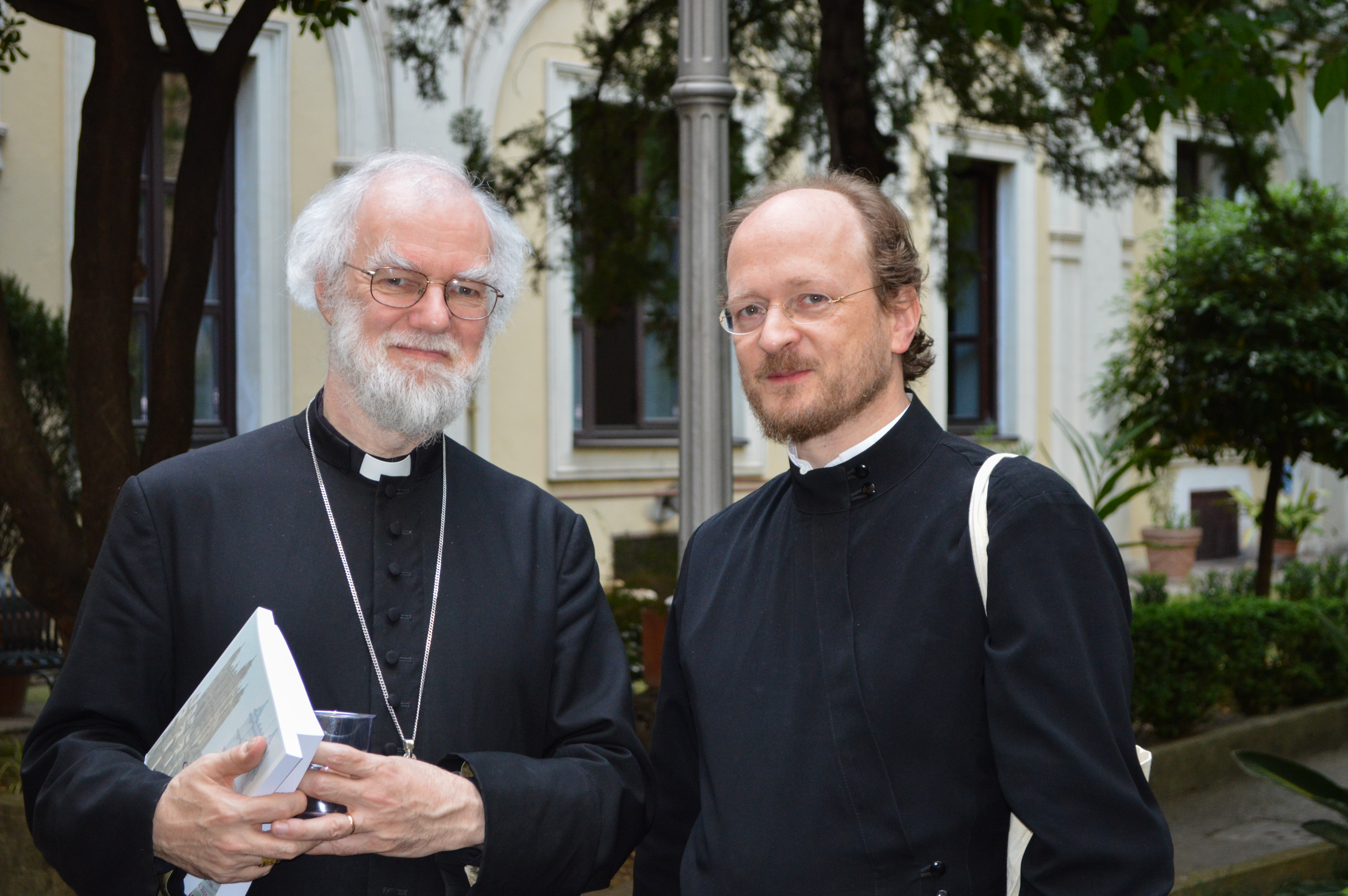
Archbishop Rowan Williams at the Orientale for the 2016 Donohue Chair lecture

Besides instruction for licentiate to doctoral degrees, the Orientale has acquired a name for its publications. In 1923 appeared the first number of Orientalia christiana. When hundred such numbers had been published, the series was divided, in 1934, in Orientalia Christiana Analecta, exclusively for monographs, and Orientalia Chrisitana Periodica, for articles and book reviews. These publications were written by experts in the field and acquired by libraries. After the promulgation of the Code of Canons of the Eastern Churches (CCEO), in 1990, it was decided to launch a new series for monographs in canon law. In 1992 a new publication, Kanonika, was published, whose first number appeared in 1992. The critical edition of Anaphorae Orientales, beginning with Alphonse Raes in 1939, brought attention to one among the many forgotten treasures of the Christian East and has been continued by the renowned liturgist of the Orientale, Professor Robert Taft, SJ. When William Macomber published the oldest known text of the Anaphora of Addai and Mari, little could he have imagined how useful it was for the Congregation of Faith in 2001 when it decided for the orthodoxy and validity of an anaphora without the explicit words of consecration.

== Notable achievements ==
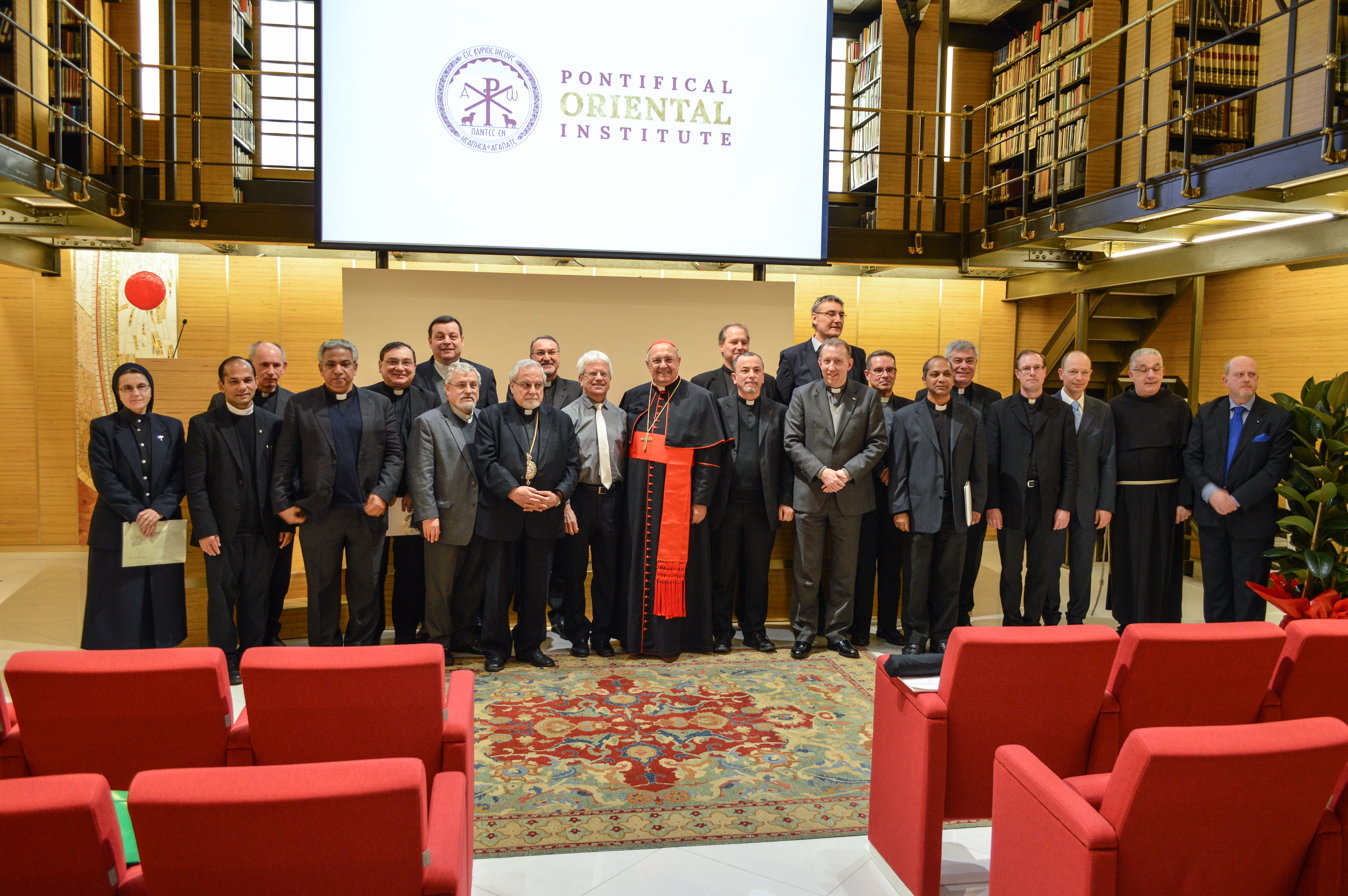
Symposium on the crises in Syria hosted at the Orientale, 2017

The CCEO was to a large extent prepared at the Orientale. It represents a huge step forward for Easterners because, for the first time, they have a law of their own, allowing each of the sui juris Churches in the East to further develop its own particular law. (b) Another monumental contribution was the critical edition of the documents of the Council of Florence (1438-1445) by the professors of the Faculty of Eastern Ecclesial Sciences. This led to the decision of Pius XII in 1947 to purify the Armenian Catholic Rite of Latinization. Among other scholarly works of note are the finest study to date, in 6 volumes, of the Liturgy of St. John Chrysostom; the Encyclopedic Dictionary of the Christian East; annotated translations of 9th-13th-century Syrian manuscripts; a seven-volume edition of Vatican archival documents on the Armenian Question (1894-1925); a similar edition on the Chaldean-Assyrian question (1908-1938); annotated catalog of 150 Ethiopian manuscripts; detailed archaeological studies of mosaics, frescoes, and architecture of the early church in Asia Minor, and so on.

== Notable professors ==
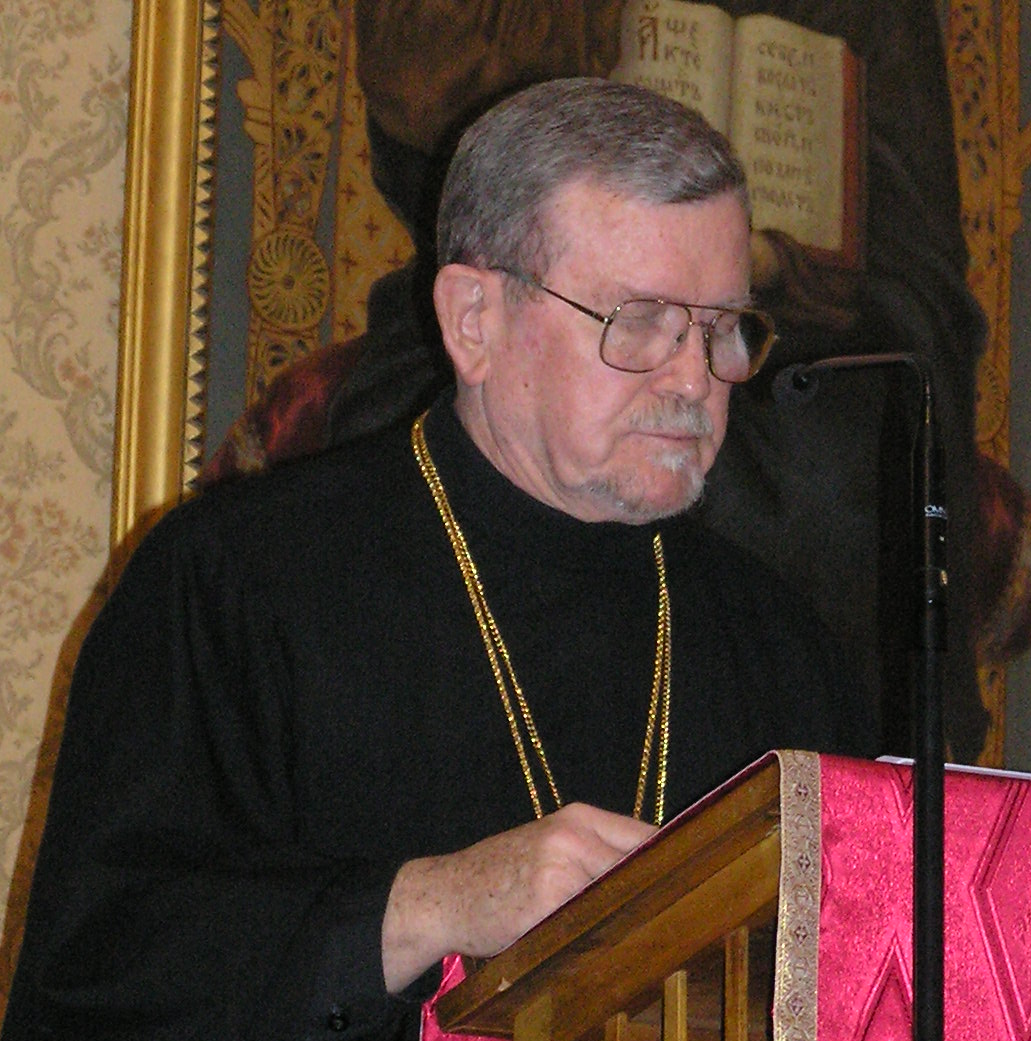
Renowned liturgist of the Orientale, Professor Robert Taft, SJ.

Guillaume Jerphanion, SJ, made a name for himself through his study of archaeology and the rock-hewn churches of Cappadocia. Marcel Viller, SJ, after teaching patristics at the Orientale, moved to become one of the founders of the monumental Dictionnaire de Spiritualité. According to his successor Cardinal Tomáš Špidlík, SJ, himself a noted exponent for Russian spiritual theology, Irenée Hausherr laid the foundations of Eastern spirituality, and his books sell as if they were written yesterday – as do the works of Juan Mateos, SJ, who, in the wake of Anton Baumstark (1872-1948), is considered by R.F. Taft, SJ and G. Winkler, to have founded at the Orientale "The Mateos School of Comparative Liturgiology". Georg Hofmann, SJ, was a German Church historian, who had a big part in the editing of the Florentine Acts.

The Orientale has been blessed with a whole generation of outstanding liturgists, such as Miguel Arranz, SJ. Samir Khalil Samir, SJ has put the Arab-Christian Literature on the map. Gustav Wetter, SJ was a world authority on Marxism. Placid J. Podipara, C.M.I, was a world expert on the St Thomas Christians.

== Notable alumni ==
- Patriarch Bartholomew I of Constantinople, who studied here from 1963 to 1968 and wrote his thesis, On the Codification of the Sacred Canons and of the Canonical Precepts, under Prof. Ivan Žužek.

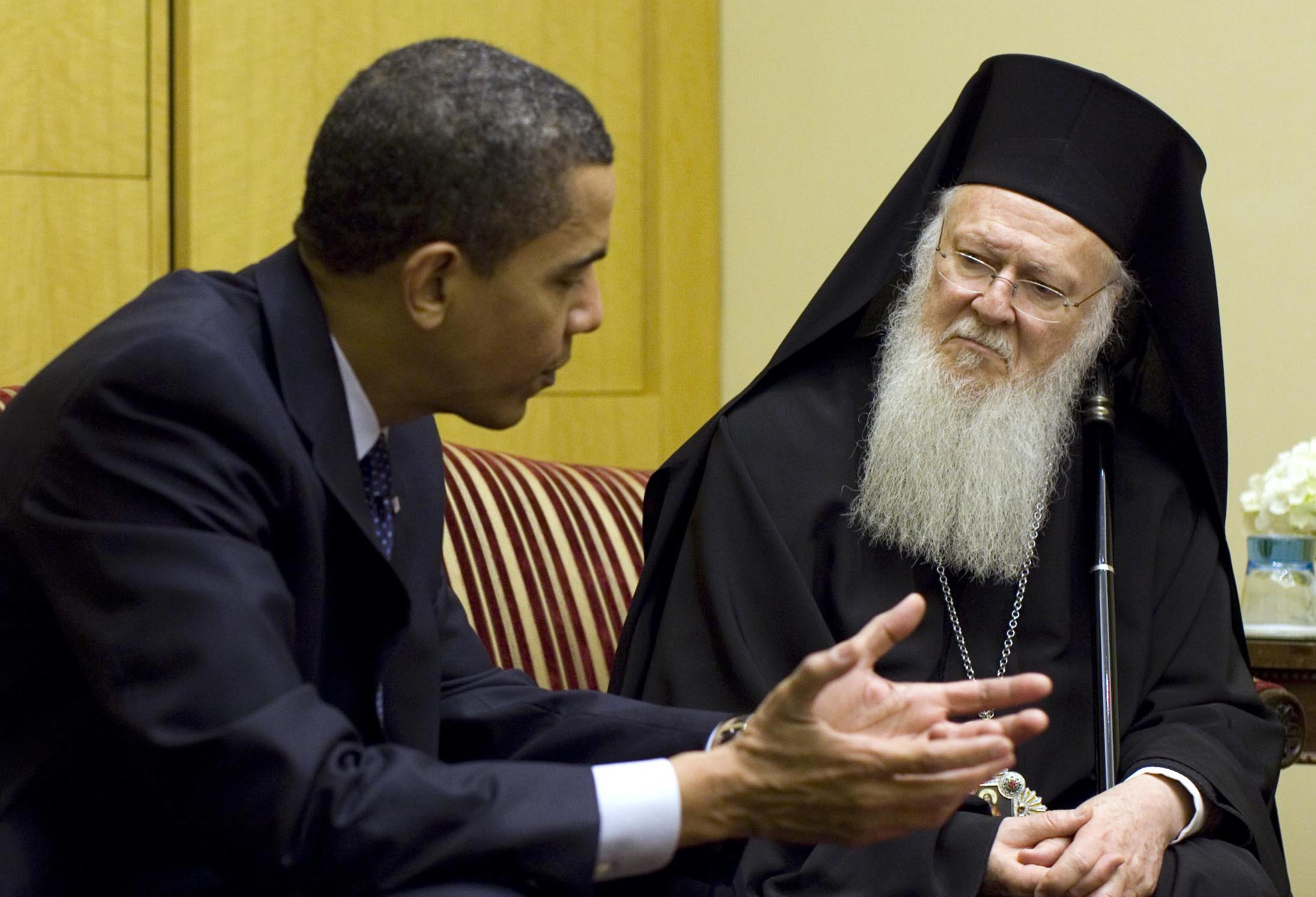
President Barack Obama meets with Greek Orthodox Ecumenical Patriarch Bartholomew I, an alumnus of the Orientale.

- Patriarch Gregorios III Laham, Catholic Patriarch emeritus of Antioch
- Cardinal Josef Slipyj, first Major Archbishop of the Greek Catholic Church in Ukraine.
- Patriarch Paul Cheiko Paul, Patriarch of Babylon of the Chaldeans
- Patriarch Bidawid Raphael, Patriarch of Babylon of the Chaldeans
- Patriarch Ignace Antoine Hayek, Patriarch of Antioch of the Syrians
- Patriarch Paul Méouchi, Patriarch of Antioch of the Maronites
- Patriarch Stephanos I Sidarouss, Patriarch of Alexandria of the Copts
- Catholicos Baselios Marthoma Mathews III, primate of the Malankara Orthodox Syrian Church
- Maj. Archbishop Sviatoslav Shevchuk, Major Archbishop of the Ukrainian Greek Catholic Church
- Patriarch Mar Awa III, Catholicos-Patriarch of the Assyrian Church of the East
- Maj. Archbishop Raphael Thattil, Major Archbishop of the Syro-Malabar Catholic Church
- Two Superiors General of the Society of Jesus: Peter Kolvenbach, who was rector of the Orientale, and Jean-Baptiste Janssens
- Cardinal Alfredo Ildefonso Schuster, OSB, first president of the Orientale and professor of liturgy at the Orientale
- Cardinal Gregorio Pietro Agaganian
- Cardinal Franz König, Cardinal Archbishop of Vienna and founder of Pro Oriente
- Cardinal Franz Ehrle, one-time professor at the Orientale
- Cardinal Ladisław Ruben, Prefect of the Eastern Congregation
- Cardinal Eugène Tisserant, Secretary of the Congregation
- Cardinal Jozef Tomko, Prefect emeritus of the Congregation for the Evangelization of the Nations
- Cardinal Aloys Grillmeier, SJ, patrologist and scholar
- Cardinal Tomáš Josef Špidlík, SJ, noted author on Eastern Christian spirituality
- Archbishop Pietro Sfair, Titular Archbishop of Nisibis dei Maroniti and Council Father at Second Vatican Council

The list of famous students begins with Blessed Eugène Bossilkoff, bishop of Nicopolis in Bulgaria and martyr. In April 2013, two alumni Orthodox bishops were kidnapped in Aleppo, Syria: Greek Orthodox Bishop Paul Yazigi and Syrian Orthodox Bishop Mor Gregorius Yohanna Ibrahim. Their whereabouts remain unknown. Other alumni of singular note are: Engelbert Kirschbaum, SJ, archeologist; Robert Murray, SJ, Syriacist; Alessandro Bausani, islamologist; Hans-Joachim Schultz, liturgist, Lambert Beauduin, OSB, founder of Chevetogne and René Vouillaume, prior of the Petits Frères de Jésus. A promising theologian, who was shot dead by the Nazis during World War II, studied here, too: Yves de Montcheiul, SJ (1900-1942).

== Publications ==
- Orientalia Christiana Analecta publishes book-length works by experts on Eastern Christianity.
- Orientalia Christiana Periodica contains articles and book reviews.
- Kanonika covers topics on canon law.
- Anaphorae Orientales prints Eucharistic prayers of the Christian East.
- Edizioni Orientalia Christiana also publishes single works.

== Additional associates and alumni ==
- Ecumenical Patriarch Bartholomew I
- Archbishop Mar Andrews Thazhath
- Mar Thomas Elavanal
- Archbishop Mar Jacob Thoomkuzhy
- Mar Pauly Kannookadan
- Mar Paul Alappat
- Mar Sebastian Vadakel
- Mar Joseph Kodakallil
- Archbishop Mar Mathew Moolakkatt
- Mar George Madathikandathil
- Mar Peter Kochupurackal
- Archbishop Mar Kuriakose Bharanikulangara
- Eugene Bossilkov
- Virgilio Canio Corbo
- Peter Dufka
- John D. Faris
- Michael Daniel Findikyan
- Borys Gudziak
- Moussa El-Hage
- Édouard Hambye
- Irénée Hausherr
- Michel d'Herbigny
- Mar Sarhad Yawsip Jammo
- Guillaume de Jerphanion
- Martin Jugie
- Peter Hans Kolvenbach
- Stjepan Krizin Sakač
- Xavier Koodopuzha
- Hlib Lonchyna
- Thomas Mar Koorilos
- Teodor Martynyuk
- Józef Milik
- Paul Mulla
- George Nedungatt
- Andrew Pataki
- Aurel Percă
- Victor J. Pospishil
- Dimitri Salachas
- Samir Khalil Samir
- Leonardo Sandri
- E. Anne Schwerdtfeger
- Josyf Slipyj
- Joseph Soueif
- Tomáš Špidlík
- Robert F. Taft
- William Toma
- Alexandr Volkonsky
- Cyril Vasiľ
- Ivan Žužek
- Archbishop Amfilohije, Metropolitan of Montenegro

== See also ==
- List of Jesuit sites
