= Giuseppe Valerga =

Italian Roman Catholic cleric

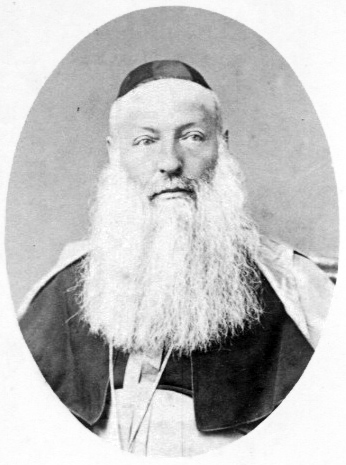
Patriarch Giuseppe Valerga

Giuseppe Valerga (9 April 1813 – 2 December 1872) was the Latin Patriarch of Jerusalem from 1847 until his death in 1872; the first resident such since the Crusades. He held the title of one of the fathers of the First Vatican Council. In addition, he was Grand Master of the Order of the Holy Sepulchre.

== Biography ==
Valerga was born in Loano. In 1836 he was ordained a priest. He studied at the Albenga Seminary and at Sapienza University of Rome. Prior to receiving his appointment at Jerusalem, Valerga had been part of the Propaganda Fide and had also worked with the Chaldean Catholic Church, in what is today Iraq.

In his efforts to reestablish the Latin Patriarchate, Valerga strove to make the Catholic faith the religion of the Palestinian villagers. The new patriarch "established Latin missions in Palestinian towns and villages where Christian communities resided, such as Bayt Jala (1853), Jifna and Lidda (1856), Ramallah (1857), Bir Zayt and Tayba (1859) and Nablus (1862)".

While serving as Latin Patriarch of Jerusalem, he was the last individual to have been dubbed as a Knight of the Holy Sepulchre by the Franciscan Custody of the Holy Land, on 16 January 1848. He was subsequently appointed Grand Master of the Order of the Holy Sepulchre at its reconstitution by Pope Pius IX in 1868.

Shalit notes that "when the patriarch ceremoniously entered the Church of the Holy Sepulchre, the French and Sardinian consuls both marched beside him - the French on the right, and the Sardinian on the left. This clearly indicated the special position of the Sardinian at the expense of the Frenchman. The patriarch's patriotism made him supportive of the Sardinian policy, which aimed at an independent Sardinian protectorate to parallel the French protectorate."

== Co-Cathedral ==
Valerga envisioned the importance of providing a new church to the Latin Patriarchate of Jerusalem. The Co-Cathedral of the Most Holy Name of Jesus was constructed and consecrated on 11 February 1872, the 25th anniversary of his Patriarchal consecration. The Co-Cathedral has continued to be the principal or “mother” church of the Diocese of Jerusalem, and the church in which the Latin Patriarch of Jerusalem has his official chair (cathedra).

== Distinctions ==
- Holy See: Grand Master of the Order of the Holy Sepulchre (Knighted 16 January 1848 by the Franciscan Custody of the Holy Land)

== Sources ==
- Catholic Hierarchy entry
- , geocities.com
- , lpj.org

Catholic Church titles
Preceded by Custody of the Holy Land of the Order of Friars Minor	Grand Master of the Order of the Holy Sepulchre; 1847–1872	Succeeded by Giovanni Vincenzo Bracco
