= Žužek =

Žužek is a Slovene surname. Notable people with the surname include:

- Ivan Žužek (1924–2004), Slovenian Jesuit priest and Canonist
- Suzie Zuzek (1920–2011), American textile designer of Yugoslav descent
- Žan Žužek (born 1997), Slovenian footballer
