= Martin Jugie =

French scholar

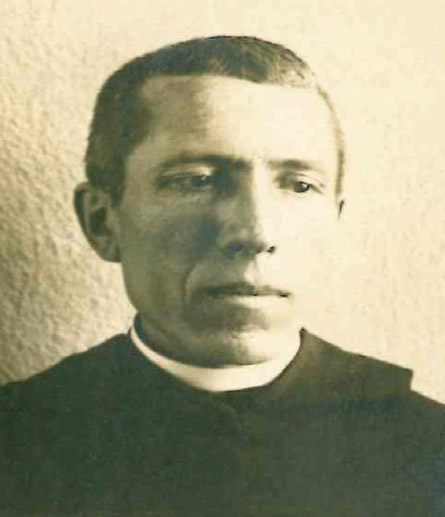
Martin Jugie AA 1878-1954

Martin Jugie (baptized as Étienne; 3 May 1878, Paulhiac – 29 November 1954, Lorgues) was a French Catholic priest and scholar.

== Biography ==
Jugie was initially educated within the Assumptionist minor seminaries of Le Breuil in Deux-Sèvres between 1891 and 1893 and Clairmarais at Pas-de-Calais between 1893 and 1895, before entering the Assumptionist novitiate at Livry-Gargan on 10 August 1895, taking the religious name, Martin, before making his first vows precisely a year later. Jugie made his perpetual vows at the Assumptionist house in Jerusalem on 15 August 1897, whereupon Jugie undertook studies in philosophy between 1896 and 1898, before progressing on to study theology therein between 1898 and 1902. On 21 December 1901 Jugie was ordained to the priesthood by Luigi Piavi, the Latin Patriarch of Jerusalem.

Against the background of the declining Ottoman Empire, the Assumptionists had established a presence therein, where, in accord with preceding French religious, the order was permitted to evangelise the Eastern and Oriental Orthodox population of the Ottoman Empire based upon the Capitulations the Empire had established with France. The Assumptionists had established a house of studies at Kadıköy on the Bosporus in 1895 in order to bolster this proselytory mission following the promulgation of Pope Leo XIII's Apostolic Letter, Praeclara gratulationis publicae on 20 June 1894. In September 1902, Jugie was sent to Kadiköy, where he first provided instruction in Greek between 1902 and 1903, before teaching Dogmatic Theology and Canon Law therein between 1903 and 1904. Following a brief tenure as a director of Kadiköy's Greek alumnate between 1904 and 1905, Jugie returned to providing teaching in Dogmatic Theology through to 1914. Contextually, Kadiköy had quickly established itself as an important centre of scholarship, as exemplified by the fact that, in 1897, the institute founded one of the foremost journals in Oriental studies under the editorship of the future Latin Archbishop of Athens, Louis Petit, the Echos d’Orient, for which Jugie produced numerous articles for throughout his literary career.

With the outbreak of World War One, between 1915 and 1917, Jugie was stationed in Limoges in order to fulfil mandatory military service for the French Army. Subsequently, in 1917, Jugie was appointed as a teacher in theology at the recently established Pontifical Oriental Institute in Rome, where he would continue to provide instruction through to 1952. During his period therein, Jugie produced two of his most notable opera, including his two-part article treating the fourteenth-century Byzantine Orthodox theologian, Gregory Palamas and the Hesychast controversy titled 'Grégoire Palamas et la controverse palamite' for the multi-volume Dictionnaire de Théologie Catholique, and his five-volume historical exposition of Eastern Christian theology, the Theologia dogmatica christianorum orientalium. Moreover, alongside Louis Petit and Xenophon A. Sideridès, Jugie produced an eight-volume critical edition of the opera omnia of the fifteenth-century Eastern Orthodox theologian and the first Ecumenical Patriarch of Constantinople under Ottoman rule, George-Gennadios Scholarios. Jugie also provided instruction at the Pontifical Lateran University and the Institut catholique in Lyons, with his students in the latter including the Assumptionist Patristics scholar, Antoine Wenger.

Having begun to suffer from Parkinson's disease in 1953, Martin retired from teaching. He died on 29 November 1954 in Lorgues and was buried the next day.
