= Bracco (surname) =

Bracco is an Italian surname. Notable people with the surname include:

- Angela Bracco (born 1955), Italian physicist
- C. A. Bracco (died 1905), Italian mandolinist, violinist and conductor
- Elizabeth Bracco (born 1957), American actress
- Giovanni Bracco (1908–1968), Italian racing car driver
- Giovanni Vincenzo Bracco (1835–1889), Latin Patriarch of Jerusalem
- Jeremy Bracco (born 1997), American ice hockey player
- Lorraine Bracco (born 1954), American actress
- Lucas Bracco (born 1996), Argentine footballer
- Roberto Bracco (1861–1943), Italian playwright and screenwriter
- Blessed Teresa Bracco (1924–1944), Italian Roman Catholic, killed during World War II after refusing to submit to the sexual aggression of a Nazi soldier
- Tommy Bracco (born 1990), American actor
