= Brako =

Brako may refer to:

- Pagotto Brako, Italian ultralight trike aircraft design
- Ben Brako (born 1952), Ghanaian highlife artiste
- Kofi Brako (born 1959), Ghanaian politician
- Lois Brako (born 1950), American botanist, mycologist and explorer

== See also ==
- Braco (disambiguation)
