= Guillaume de Jerphanion =

Guillaume de Jerphanion S.J.
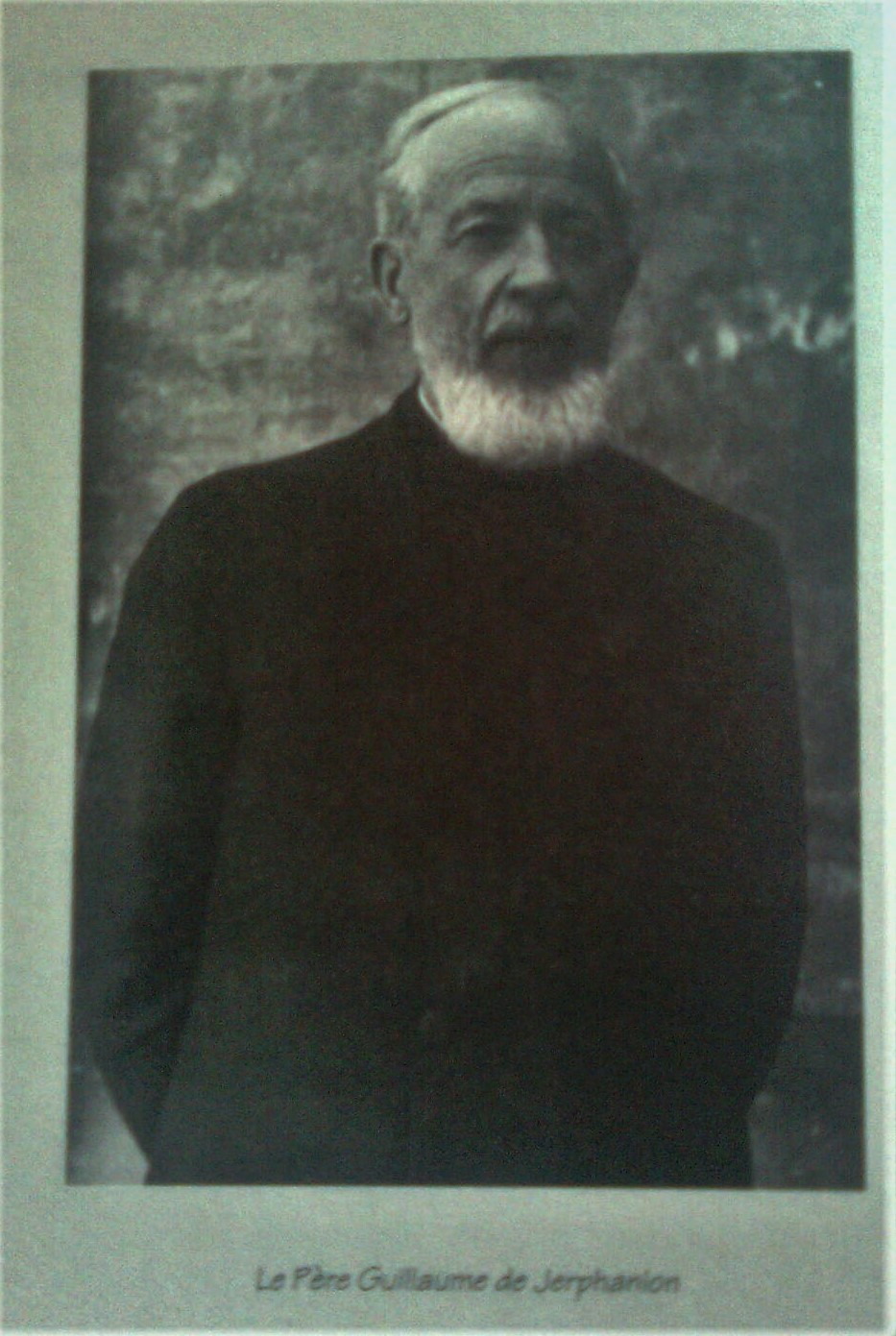
- epigrapher, geographer, photographer, linguist, archaeologist and Byzantinist

Personal life
- Born: 3 March 1877 Pontevès, France
- Died: 22 October 1948 (aged 71) Rome, Italy
- Notable work(s): Une nouvelle province de l'art byzantin, les églises rupestres de Cappadoce (5 volumes, 1925–42

Religious life
- Religion: Catholic
- Order: Society of Jesus

Guillaume de Jerphanion, born at Pontevès in 1877, died in Rome on 22 October 1948, was a French Jesuit, archaeologist and explorer of Cappadocia.

== Biography ==
Guillaume de Jerphanion was born on 3 March 1877, the third in a family of eight children. He came from a family of old nobility originating from Haute-Loire in France.

Rather than a career as a naval officer, he chose to join the Jesuits when he was 16 years of age.

In 1903 Guillaume was sent to Tokat in Turkey to teach science to Armenian children in one of the numerous schools founded by the Jesuits in Anatolia.

He remained in Tokat until 1907. During his time in Tokat he learned Turkish, a language he came to master perfectly. Before returning to France to study theology and be ordained a priest, he traveled through Anatolia (Amasya - Ankara - Samsun - Sivas...) and discovered Cappadocia.

About the Jesuit schools of Anatolia

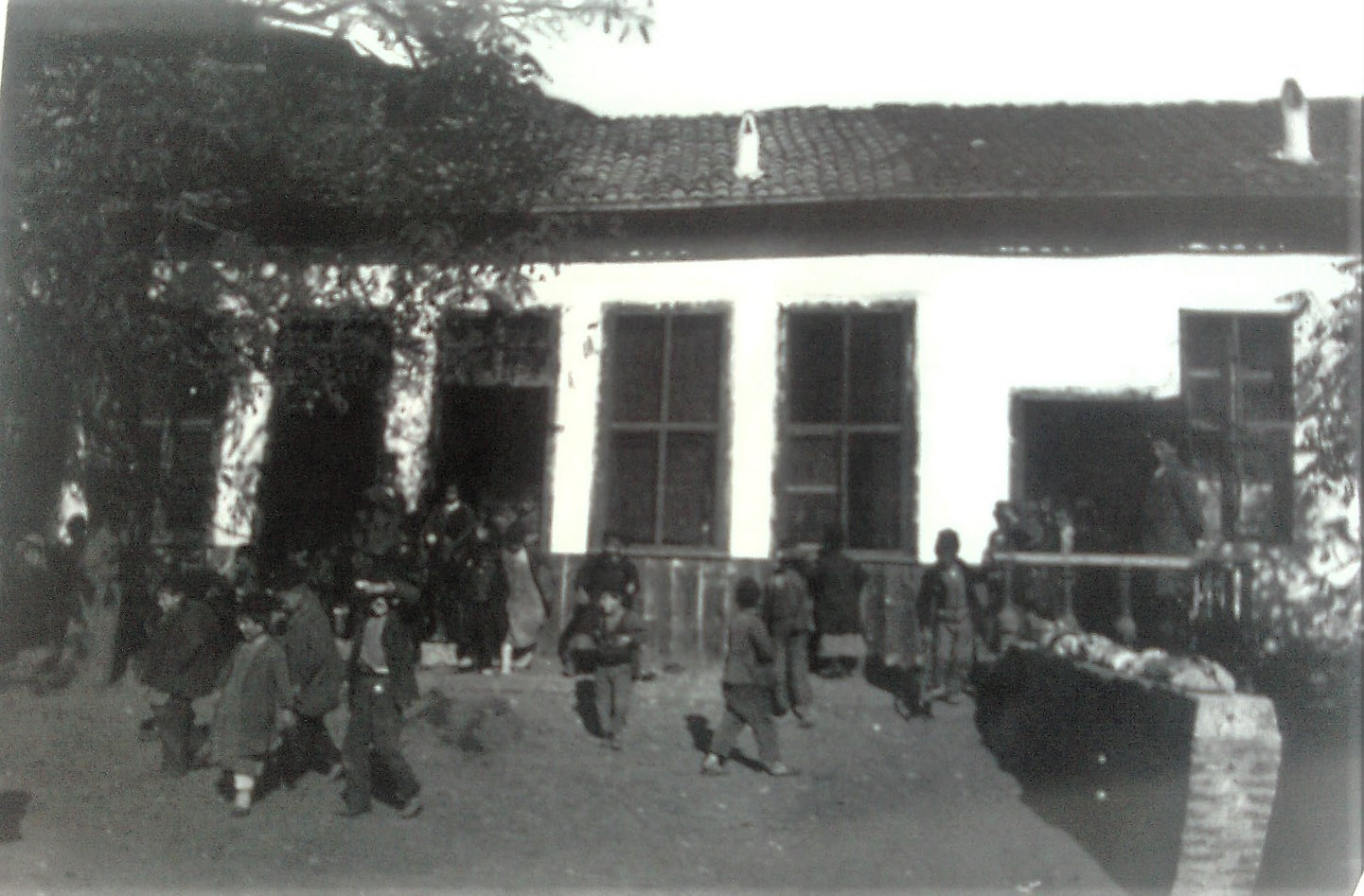
Jesuits' school - Around 1907 - Picture taken by Jerphanion

Between 1881 and 1924, the Jesuits opened 11 free and mixed schools as well as 6 free schools for girls and 12 other fee-paying schools for boys and girls all over Anatolia. There were 550 students in all in 1886, 5,521 in 1914. The number of Jesuits serving in those schools peaked at just under 60. The language of instruction was French. The schools welcomed mainly Christian children but also, for "evening classes," non-Christians, such as Jews and the children of Turkish notables attracted by the French language, the language of diplomacy and commerce of the time. In the girls' schools, the Jesuits were assisted by many nuns. To keep the young people busy outside of school hours, the Jesuits organized conferences and activities (brass bands, music lessons, theater lessons, etc.)

Returning to Turkey in 1911 Guillaume de Jerphanion was a member of the Jesuit community in Istanbul, and he organized his trips to Cappadocia from there.

World War I drove him away from Turkey. He served as an officer-interpreter with the French Légion d'Orient in Cyprus until 1918 then return to Turkey in 1921. While taking care of the publication of his work on the rock-cut churches of Cappadocia, he was also in charge of closing most of the schools and houses that the Jesuits owned in the east of the country.

Guillaume de Jerphanion left Turkey for good in 1927 to become professor of Christian archeology at the Pontifical Oriental Institute in Rome. He is elected as a member of the French Académie des inscriptions et belles-lettres in 1947. It was in Rome that he died in 1948.

== Guillaume de Jerphanion, writer and photographer ==
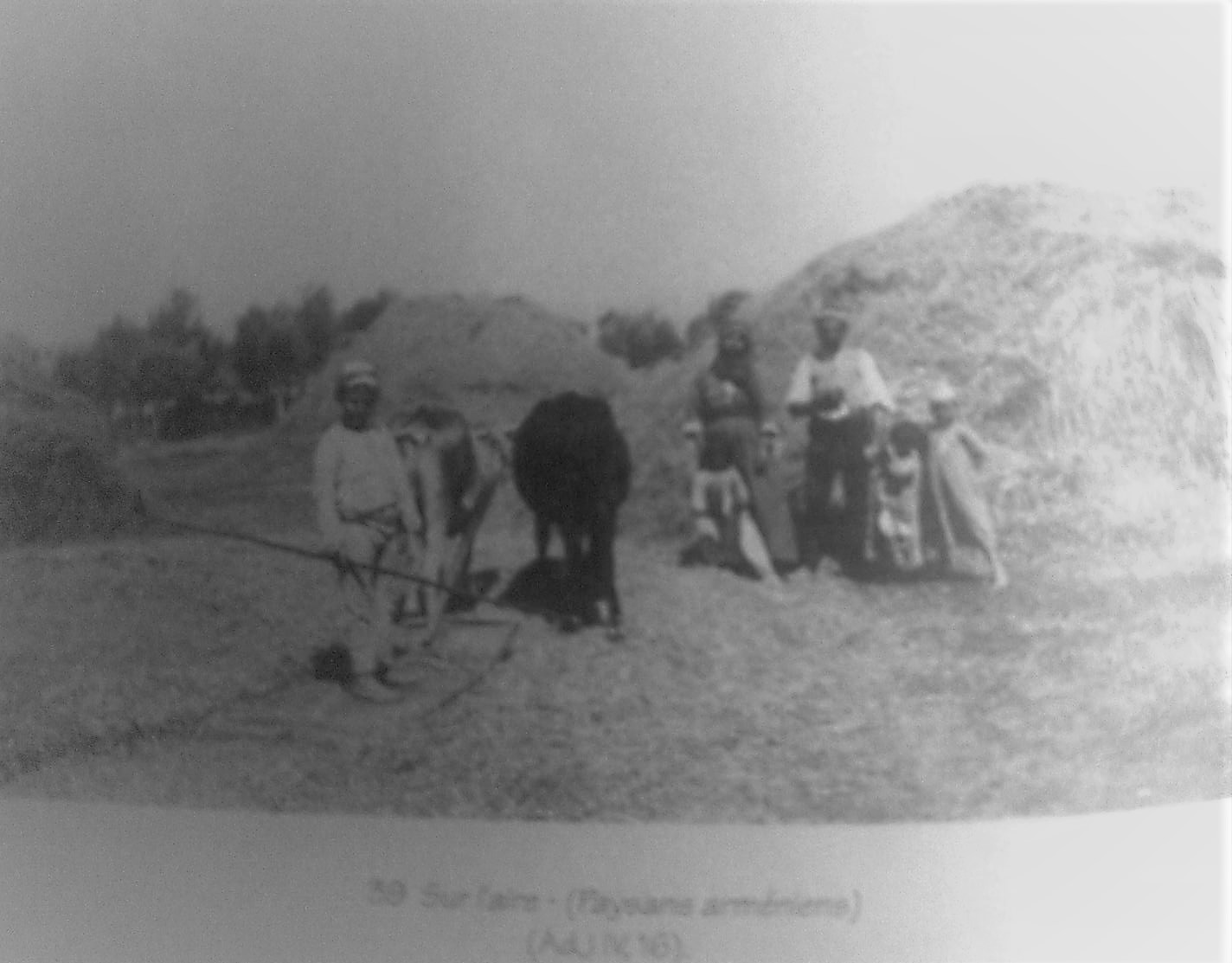
Armenian peasants - Amasya - Around 1907 - Picture taken by Jerphanion

Throughout his travels Guillaume de Jerphanion kept a journal in which he wrote many of his discoveries and impressions. Coming from a nobility attached to the land, he was touched by the great poverty that reigned in Anatolia. He was struck by the miserable situation of the peasants and their exploitation by the large landowners who rented the land to them. At the same time as he wrote down his impressions, he took many photographs, of landscapes, rural scenes, people and monuments. Today his photos are scattered throughout the Jesuit archives in Beirut, Rome and Paris.

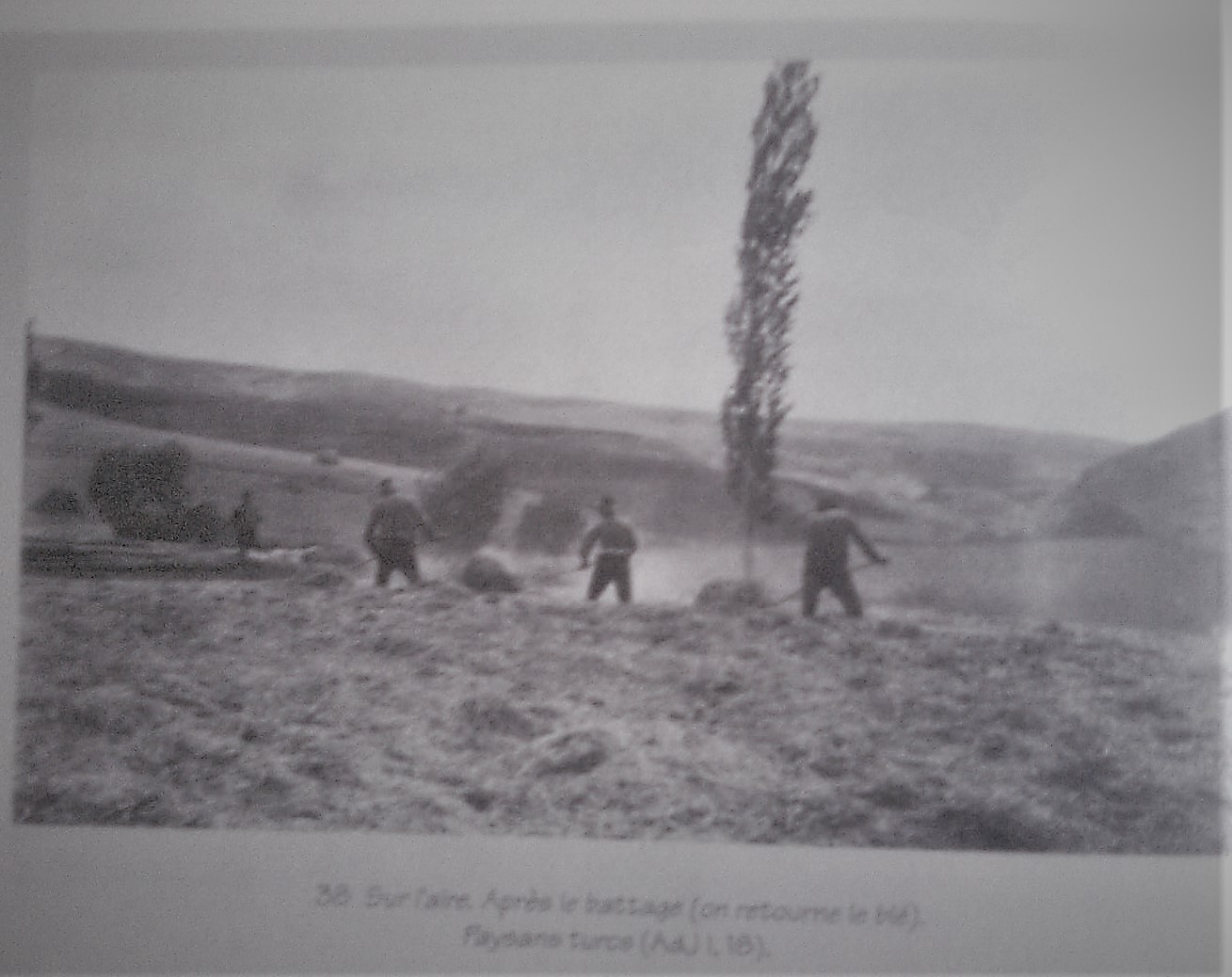
Turkish peasants - Amasya - Around 1907 - Picture taken by Jerphanion

== His work: Une nouvelle province de l'art byzantin, les églises rupestres de Cappadoce (5 volumes, 1925–42) ==
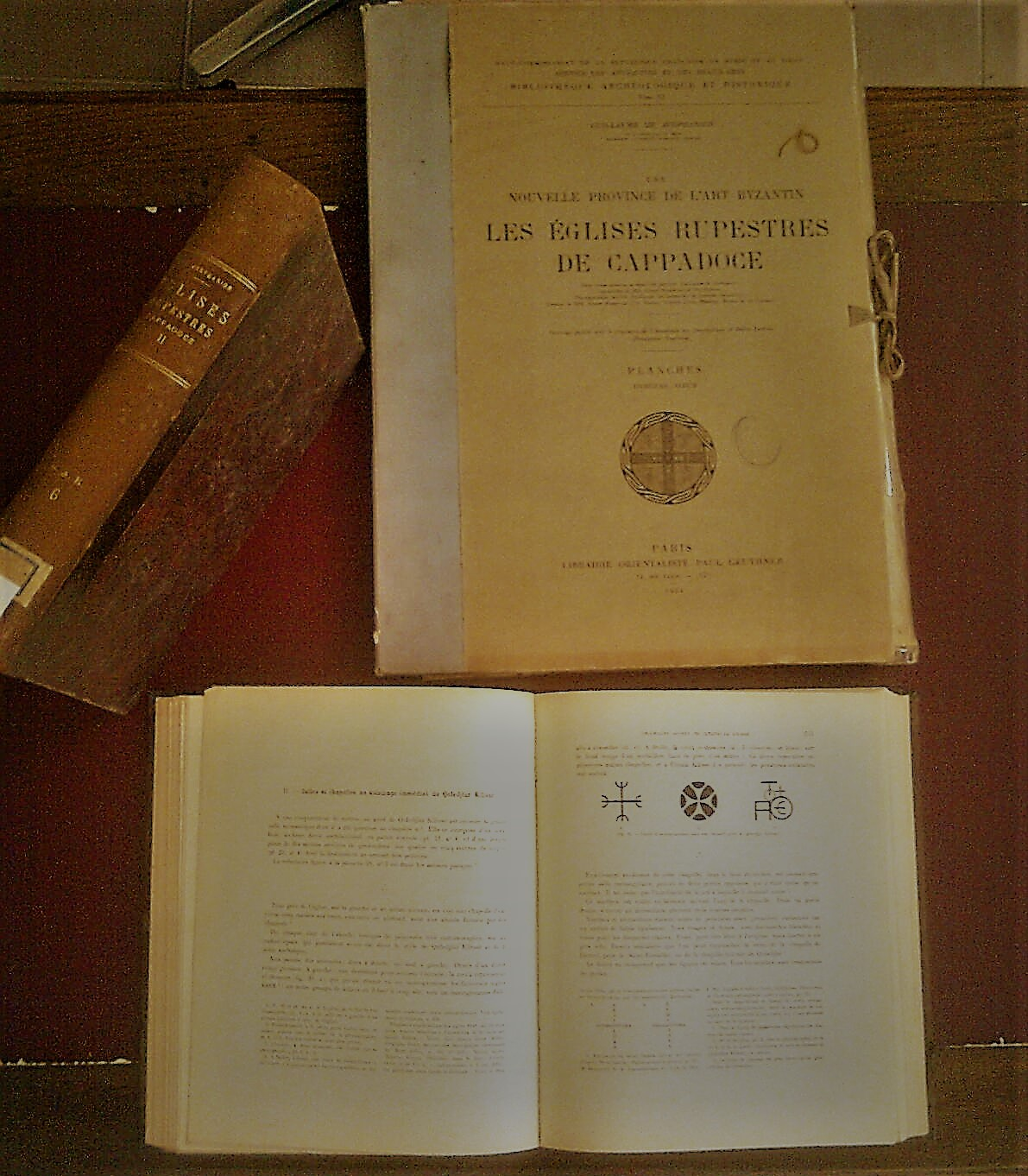
Jerphanion's books

"Une nouvelle province de l'art byzantin, les églises rupestres de Cappadoce" is a work on the churches of Cappadocia that was written following 3 trips to Cappadocia, the first in August 1907, the second and the most important in 1911 (from August 1911 to January 1912) and finally the third in August–September 1912.

In the 5 volumes that constitute the complete work, a whole series of monuments from different periods between the 9th and the 13th centuries, and mainly located in the Ürgüp region, are listed in a methodical and homogeneous manner. The complete work therefore constitutes a large inventory. We find in it described about 100 churches and the more than 230 church monuments that Christian Cappadocia contains. The text and the plan of the churches is accompanied by photos, line drawings and some color plates.

The publication of the work was first scheduled for 1913. According to his own account (see introduction to Volume 1) three-quarters of the work was ready for publication in Beirut when the First World War broke out. At the end of the war the manuscripts and color plates left abandoned in a shed were found in poor condition, unusable, so that Guillaume de Jerphanion had to start all over again. Luckily his notes that were kept in the Jesuit residence in Istanbul, and his photos that he had kept with him in France were safe. Eventually the publication of the work extended between 1925 and 1942.

Guillaume de Jerphanion can be considered the founder of Cappadocian studies.

== Selected works ==
- La Légion d'Orient, Études (1919).
- Une nouvelle province de l'art byzantin, les églises rupestres de Cappadoce (5 volumes, 1925–42).
- Mélanges d’archéologie anatolienne: Monuments préhelléniques, gréco-romains, byzantins et musulmans de Pont, de Cappadoce et de Galatie (Mélanges de l'Université Saint-Joseph, Beyrouth 13, 1928).
- La Voix des monuments. Notes et études d'archéologie chrétienne (1930).
- La Voix des monuments. Étude d'archéologie. Nouvelle série (1938).
