= Robert F. Taft =

American Jesuit historian and liturgist

The Right Reverend Archimandrite Robert F. Taft SJ
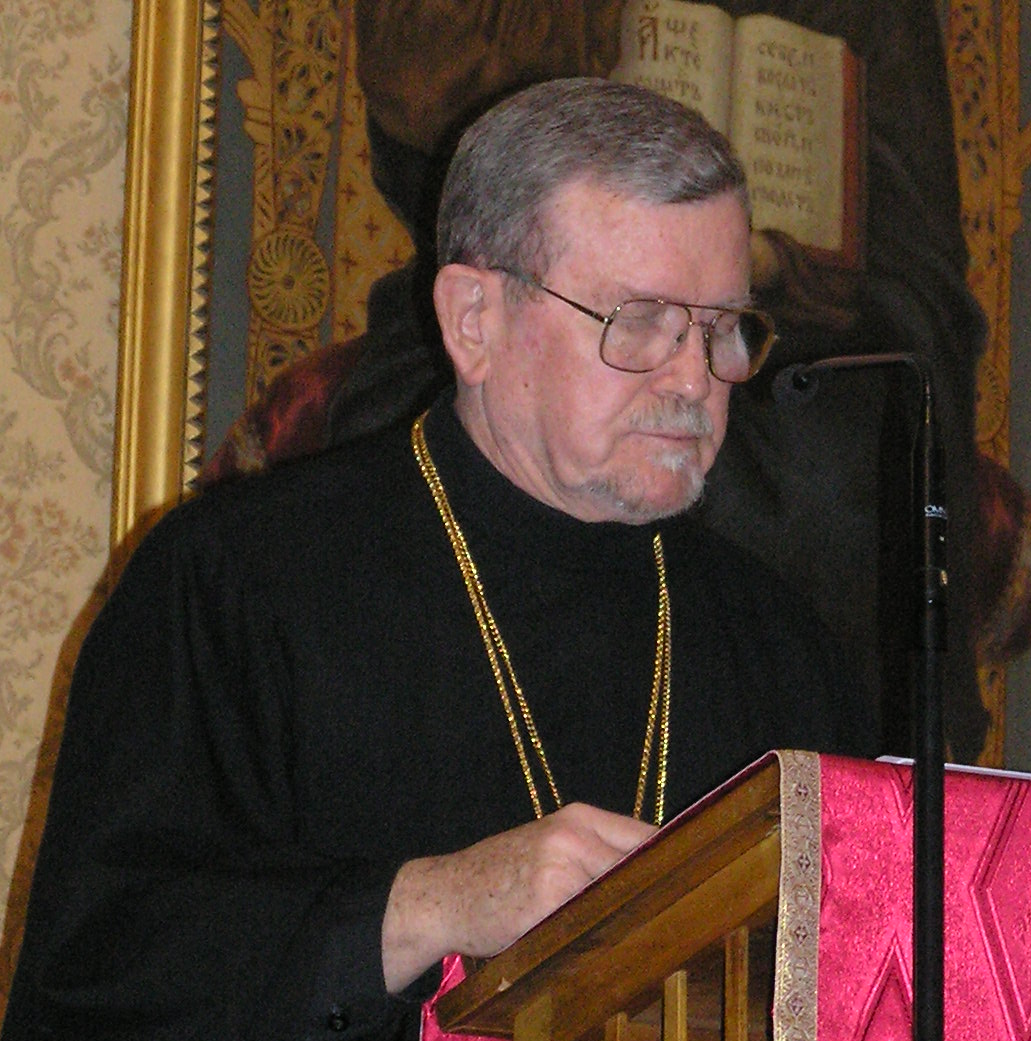
- Taft speaking at a conference in Russicum in 2006
- Other posts: Professor, Pontifical Oriental Institute, Rome, Italy

Orders
- Ordination: June 7, 1963

Personal details
- Born: January 9, 1932 Providence, Rhode Island, U.S.
- Died: November 2, 2018 (aged 86) Weston, Massachusetts, U.S.
- Denomination: Ukrainian Greek Catholic Church
- Education: Fordham University and Pontifical Oriental Institute

Robert Francis Taft SJ (January 9, 1932 – November 2, 2018) was an American Jesuit priest, first in the Russian Greek Catholic Church and later an archimandrite of the Ukrainian Greek Catholic Church. An expert in Oriental liturgy, he was a professor at the Pontifical Oriental Institute from 1975 to 2011 and its Vice-rector from 1995 to 2001.

== Biography ==
Taft was born in Providence, Rhode Island, into the Taft family notable for their contribution to American politics. Taft entered the novitiate of the Society of Jesus on August 14, 1949. He did his initial spiritual and academic training in philosophy at the former Weston College in Weston, Massachusetts. During his period of regency that followed, he taught for three years at Baghdad Jesuit College. He returned to the United States in 1959 and pursued a graduate degree in Russian at Fordham University. He was ordained a priest of the Russian Greek Catholic Church on June 7, 1963.

Developing an interest in Eastern liturgical traditions and, with his background in Russian, Taft undertook studies at the Pontifical Oriental Institute of Rome in 1970. He completed his doctoral thesis under Jesuit professor Juan Mateos on the Great Entrance of the Divine Liturgy in 1975. The work was published as The Great Entrance and immediately hailed as a classic in the field.

A professor at the Oriental institute of Rome from 1975 to 2011, and a recurring visiting professor at the University of Notre Dame over the course of two decades beginning in 1974, Taft guided innumerable doctoral theses. His expertise gained him recognition from the many Eastern churches, including the Ukrainian and Armenian Catholic Churches in Europe, the Chaldean Catholic Church in the Middle East and the Syro-Malabar and Syro-Malankara Catholic Churches in India. From 1972 to 1976, he was director of the specialized journal Orientalia Christian Periodica and from 1987 to 2004 was editor of the collection Orientalia Christiana Analecta. Consultor of several ecclesiastical dicasteries and the Vatican Congregation for the Oriental Churches, he was founder of the Societas Orientalium Liturgiarum (Society of Oriental Liturgy).

In 1998, Taft, who helped to found the Ukrainian Catholic University of Lviv, was elevated to the rank of mitered archimandrite by the Ukrainian Greek Catholic Church, granting him the use of a miter and crosier.

Taft was an outspoken observer. He called "the height of asininity" the argument that the use of Latin in the Tridentine Mass is an approach to mystery better than the use of the vernacular language in the modern Mass. He was a supporter of the synodal form of church administration, followed by the Eastern Orthodox Churches, for the entire Catholic Church.

When the issue of possible full communion with the Assyrian Church of the East was being considered, a problem arose regarding their liturgy's lacking the exact formulation of the words of consecration considered essential by the Catholic Church. Working with Taft's analysis of the situation, the Pontifical Council for Promoting Christian Unity issued a decree in 2001 which now allows members of both churches to receive communion from each other's clergy in case of emergency.

Taft was a supporter and associate of the Metropolitan Andrey Sheptytsky Institute of Eastern Christian Studies. Taft was on the International Advisory Board Of LOGOS: A Journal of Eastern Christian Studies from the earliest years.

In 2011 Taft left Rome, and the library desk at the Oriental Institute which he occupied for 46 years. He lived at Campion Center, in Weston, the site of his college studies, now a retreat and conference center, and a retirement facility of the USA Northeast Province of the Jesuits. Taft died on November 2, 2018, after which numerous scholarly and ecclesiastical communities both Catholic and Orthodox made official statements in mourning and organized academic conferences and publications to commemorate his passing.

== Honors ==
Among the many honors he received, Taft was awarded several honorary doctorates. He was twice a senior research fellow at Dumbarton Oaks (1996–1998; 1999–2001); in his second fellowship he was Chair of Dumbarton Oaks. In 2001, Taft was elected Corresponding Fellow of the British Academy, the highest honor the Academy confers on non-British academics in recognition of scholarly distinction. At least five other Jesuits have held this distinction.

In 2013, Taft was honored by his students with a celebration of the 50th year of his ordination, and was presented with a book that enumerated his over-800 publications.

== Writings ==
Taft's numerous publications, particularly on the history of Byzantine Liturgy, can be found in a variety of specialized journals. Among his books noteworthy are the following:

- The Liturgy of the Hours in East and West, 1986 (received the 'Best book in Theology' prize of the American Catholic Press Association).
- The Byzantine Rite: A Short History, Collegeville 1999 (translated in several languages).
- A History of the Liturgy of St. John Chrysostom (6 vols), Orientalia Christiana Analecta, Rome, 1978–2008.
- A History of the Liturgy of St. John Chrysostom: Vol. II, The Great Entrance: A History of the Transfer of Gifts and Other Preanaphoral Rites, 1975 (2nd revised ed., 1978; new material 4th ed., 2004).
- A History of the Liturgy of St. John Chrysostom: Vol. III, forthcoming.
- A History of the Liturgy of St. John Chrysostom: Vol. IV, The Diptychs, 1991.
- A History of the Liturgy of St. John Chrysostom: Vol. V, The Precommunion Rites, 2000.
- A History of the Liturgy of St. John Chrysostom Vol. VI: The Communion, Thanksgiving, and Concluding Rites, 2008.
