= Victor J. Pospishil =

Ukrainian Catholic priest and scholar

Archimandrite Monsignor Victor J. Pospishil (1915 – 2006) was a Ukrainian Catholic priest and a leading scholar on canon law and the Eastern Catholic churches.

== Biography ==
He was born 4 February 1915 in Vienna, Austria, then capital of Austria-Hungary. Raised Eastern Orthodox, he later joined the Catholic Church of his mother.

Pospishil studied civil law before entering the seminary.

Following his training at the University of Vienna and the Theological Academy and Seminary in Đakovo, Croatia, he was ordained a priest on 16 June 1940 for the Byzantine rite diocese of Krizveci in Yugoslavia. His first assignment was in the bishop's chancery. During World War II he served as an army chaplain and in parishes in Yugoslavia and Austria.

Having fought against the communist forces of Tito, he was unable to return to his diocese at the end of the war. Instead, he studied liturgy and canon law at the Pontifical Oriental Institute in Rome, where he received a licentiate and earned a doctorate from the Pontifical Gregorian University in 1949.

He immigrated to the United States in May 1950 where he joined the Ukrainian Catholic Archeparchy of Philadelphia. He served in parishes in Maryland, New Jersey, New York, and Pennsylvania as well as chancery assignments. He also studied psychology as a graduate student at the University of Delaware.

In recognition of his work in canon law Pope John XXIII gave him the title of Private Papal Chamberlain in 1960.

During the 1960s he was a controversial advocate for divorced Catholics, arguing in his 1967 book Divorce and Remarriage: Towards a New Catholic Teaching in favor of the reform of the laws that prevented them from receiving the sacraments. A condensed version of his book was published as an essay in Diakonia, the journal of the John XXIII Center for Eastern Christian Studies at Fordham University, and attracted the attention of the New York Times. His ideas also circulated through Morris West and Robert Francis's 1970 book Scandal in the Assembly, which Time noted "appears to owe a considerable debt" to Pospishil's 1967 book.

Though the controversial conclusions of Divorce and Remarriage attracted attention, the book also received criticism. R. L. McEwen wrote a few years later in the journal Quis Custodiet?, "The monsignor's scholarship was so subjective, to use no less polite a word, and the supporting conclusion he drew from the contemporary matrimonial scene so blunt '...the only practical remedy ... is the acceptance of divorce by the Church' that the book had a deservedly faint reception" [ellipses in the original]. Responding to David Atkinson's To Have and to Hold, which also relied on Pospishil, Gordon Wenham dismissed Divorce and Remarriage as "a light-weight work of special pleading." Wenham wrote that "It was answered with great scholarly fairness and erudition by [Henri Crouzel] in L'Eglise primitive face au divorce.

From 1966 to 1976 he served on the religious studies faculty of Manhattan College.

Pospishil advised Ukrainian Greek Catholic bishops on canon law both in the United States and elsewhere. He argued extensively and ultimately successfully for the right of the head of the Ukrainian Greek Catholic Church to convene his bishops from throughout the world as a synod, reducing the importance of the concept of canonical territory.

In 1976 was named an Archimandrite with use of episcopal insignia by Cardinal Josyf Slipyj. He was named Grand Archimandrite of Antioch by Melkite Patriarch Maximos V Hakim in 1977.

Beginning in 1991, he wrote a newspaper column on canon law for Eastern Catholic eparchial newspapers.

In 1994, he received the Role of Law Award from the Canon Law Society of America.

A resident of Matawan, New Jersey, he died 16 February 2006 at Raritan Bay Medical Center in Old Bridge Township, New Jersey and is buried in St. Gertrude Cemetery in Colonia, New Jersey.

== Books ==
- Die Rechtsstellung des Patriarchen der Serbischen Kirche in der Kirchenverfassung von 1931-1947, (Brixen im Thale, Austria: privately published, 1950)
- Interritual Canon Law Problems in the United States and Canada, (Chesapeake City, Maryland: St. Basil's, 1955)
- Code of Oriental Canon Law, the Law on Persons: Rites, Persons in General, Clergy and Hierarchy, Monks, Religious, Laity, (Ford City, Pennsylvania: St. Mary's Ukrainian Catholic Church, 1960)
- Code of Oriental Canon Law, the Law on Marriage: Interritual Marriage Law Problems, (Chicago, Illinois: Universe Editions, 1962)
- Ford City, Pennsylvania 1887-1962: The First Seventy-Five Years of Our Town, editor, (Ford City, Pennsylvania: The Ford City Public Library, 1962)
- Orientalium Ecclesiarum: The Decree on the Eastern Catholic Churches of the II Council of the Vatican, (Bronx, New York: Fordham University, 1965)
- Divorce and Remarriage: Towards a New Catholic Teaching, (New York, New York: Herder and Herder, 1967)
  - Published in Italian as Divorzio e nuovo matrimonio : contributo a un rinnovamento teologico (Milan: Bompiani, 1968), trans. by Massimiliano Calindri
- The Quest for the Ukrainian Catholic Patriarchate, co-author with Hryhor M. Luznycky, (Philadelphia, Pennsylvania: Ukrainian Publications, 1971)
- Ex Occidente Lex, (Carteret, New Jersey: St. Mary's Religious Action Fund, 1979)
- The New Latin Code of Canon Law and Eastern Catholics, co-author with John D. Faris, (Brooklyn, New York: Diocese of St. Maron, 1984)
- Eastern Catholic Marriage Law, (Brooklyn, New York: Saint Maron Publications, 1991)
- Eastern Catholic Church Law, (Brooklyn, New York: Saint Maron Publications, 1993)
- Eastern Catholic Church Law, (Brooklyn, New York: Saint Maron Publications, 2nd ed., 1996)
