= Bracco =

Bracco may also refer to:

- Bracco Italiano, a breed of dog
- Bracco (company), an international Group active in the healthcare sector, headquartered in Milan
- Bracco (surname)
