= Bracho =

Bracho may refer to:

- Bracha, a Jewish blessing or benediction
- Bracho (surname), a Spanish surname
