= Xavier Koodopuzha =

Indian theologian and scholar

Dayaraya Xavier Koodapuzha Ramban (born 28 February 1934) is an Indian theologian and academic, and the professor emeritus of Paurastya Vidhya Peedam. He was born in Chenapady, Kanjirappally, India. After completing his primary schooling, he did his tertiary studies at the St. Berchmans College in Changanacherry. He joined Parel St. Thomas Seminary in 1951, and did priestly studies at the Propaganda Fide College in Rome. He received a doctorate in theology and a master's degree in philosophy from the Urban University in Rome and master's degrees in Oriental sciences and Oriental canon law from the Pontifical Oriental Institute in Rome. He is a church historian and a scholar. He is a notable contributor to the Catholic Church.

He currently leads a monastic life in Mar Thoma Sleeha Dehra.
