= Luigi Piavi =

Italian priest and diplomat

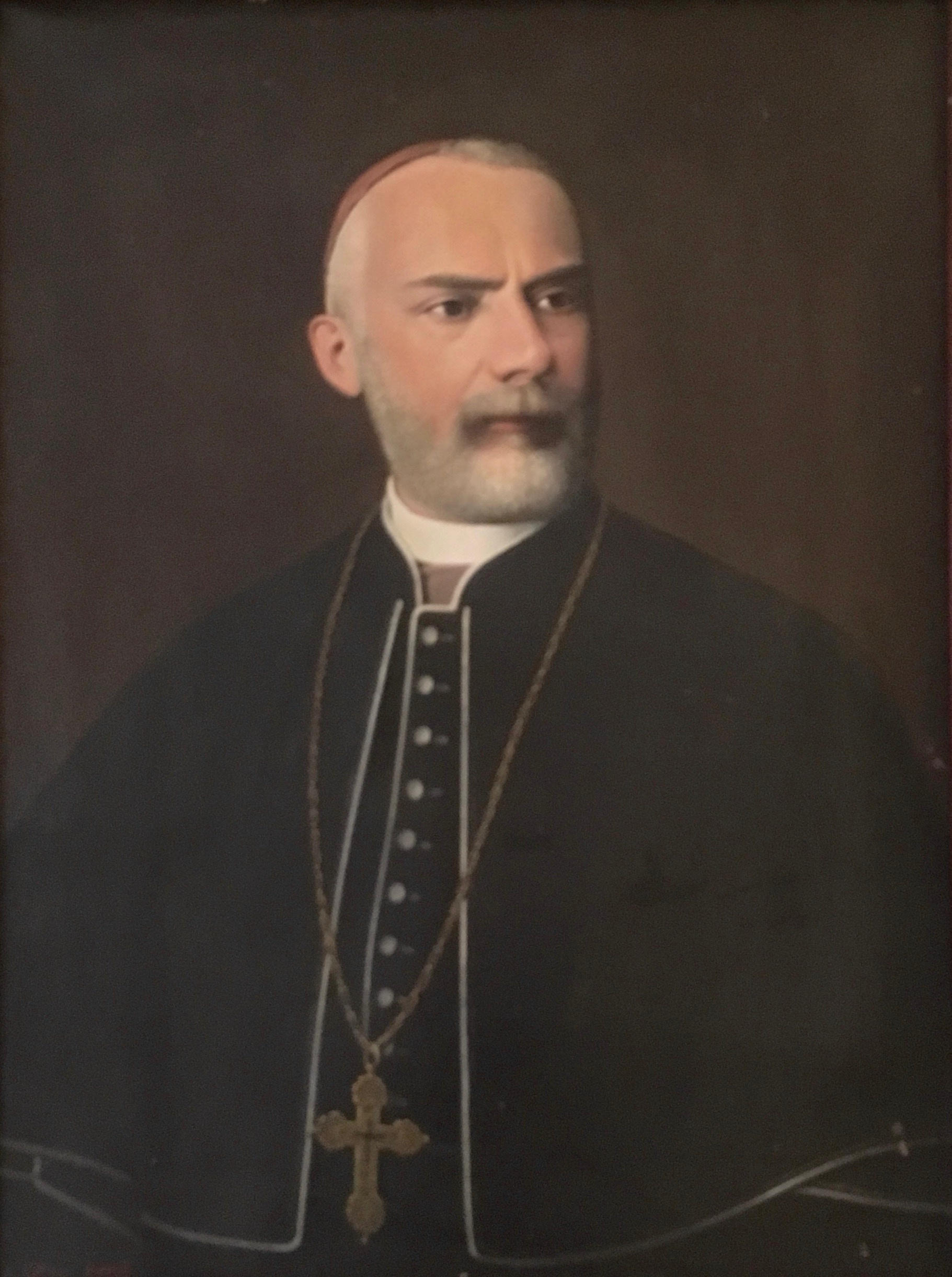
Portrait Luigi Piavi (Latin Patriarchate of Jerusalem)

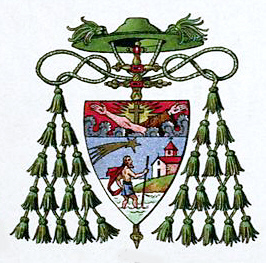
Coat of arms Luigi Pivai

Luigi Piavi, OFM (born on 17 March 1833 in Ravina, Italy - died on 24 January 1905 in Jerusalem, Ottoman Palestine) was a Latin Patriarch of Jerusalem.

== Life ==
Luigi Piavi received his priestly ordination in 1855. Pope Pius IX appointed him in 1876 Apostolic Delegate to Syria and Apostolic Vicar of Aleppo. He received his episcopal ordination as Titular Archbishop of Siunia on 18 November 1876, and in 1889 Piavi was appointed Patriarch of Jerusalem by Pope Leo XIII, the only Catholic Latin Patriarch in the East.

From 1889 until his death in 1905 he was Grand Master of the Equestrian Order of the Holy Sepulchre of Jerusalem.

Catholic Church titles
Preceded by Giovanni Vincenzo Bracco	Grand Master of the Order of the Holy Sepulchre; 1889–1905	Succeeded by Pope Pius X
