= Vincenzo Bracco =

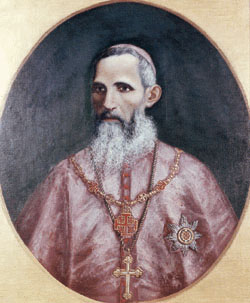
Patriarch Giovanni Vincenzo Bracco

Giovanni Vincenzo Bracco (14 September 1835 – 19 June 1889) was an Italian prelate of the Catholic Church who served as the Latin Patriarch of Jerusalem from 1873 to his death in 1889.

== Biography ==
John Vincent Bracco studied in Porto Maurizio and entered at the Alberga Seminary in 1854 to prepare to the priesthood. In 1855 he entered at Brignole Sale College at Genoa. On 18 June 1859 he received the ordination. In 1860 Bracco came as a missionary to Jerusalem. He taught philosophy and was from 1862 until his death rector of the seminary in Jerusalem.

Pope Pius IX appointed Vincenzo Bracco in 1866 Titular Bishop of Magydus and ordered him to Auxiliary bishop in Jerusalem. His episcopal ordination was given to him on 13 May 1866 by reigning patriarch Giuseppe Valerga, and his co-consecrators were the Vicar Apostolic of Galla and later Cardinal Guglielmo Massaia, OFM Cap, and an Armenian bishop. He was also beside his episcopate a Vicar general.

In 1866 Pius IX appointed him Patriarch of Jerusalem, the only Roman Catholic Patriarch in the East.

From 1873 until his death in 1889, he was Grand Master of the Order of the Holy Sepulchre.

He died of pneumonia and was buried in the church of the Patriarchate, as was his predecessor Valerga.

Catholic Church titles
| Preceded by Giuseppe Valerga | Grand Master of the Order of the Holy Sepulchre; 1873–1889 | Succeeded by Luigi Piavi |
