= Lucas Bracco =

Argentine footballer

Personal information
- Full name: Lucas Yamil José Bracco
- Date of birth: 11 October 1996 (age 30)
- Place of birth: Rosario
- Height: 1.78 m (5 ft 10 in)
- Position: Midfielder

Senior career*
Years	Team	Apps	(Gls)
2014–2016	Rosario Central	4	(0)
2016–2017	Unión La Calera	17	(1)
2017–2021	Central Córdoba de Rosario	134	(5)
2022	Sportivo Las Parejas	16	(50)
- * Club domestic league appearances and goals

Lucas Yamil José Bracco (born 11 October 1996) is an Argentine professional footballer who last played as a midfielder for Central Córdoba de Rosario in Argentina.

== Career ==
Bracco was born in Rosario, Argentina. He began his professional football career on 11 March 2016 playing in the Scotiabank Tournament for the Chilean Primera División club Unión La Calera. He played for La Calera during the 2015–16 tournament of Chile's top-tier football league (Primera División) and in the 2016–17 Loto tournament of Chile's second-tier league (Primera B). His first goal in Chile's Primera División was for the Copa Chile competition on 9 July 2016, bringing the score to 1–0 against San Luis de Quillota, a classic rival of Unión La Calera.

On 14 February 2017, Bracco signed a professional contract with Central Córdoba de Rosario, thus joining Argentina's Primera C Metropolitana league. Central Córdoba won second place in the Primera C tournament of 2017–18.
