= Bracho (surname) =

Bracho is a Spanish surname and can refer to the following people:

- Alejandro Bracho (born 1955), Mexican actor
- Andrea Palma (born Guadalupe Bracho Pérez-Gavilán; 1903–1987), Mexican film and television actress
- Ángel Bracho (1911–2005), Mexican engraver and painter
- Carlos Bracho (born 1937), Mexican actor and writer
- Carlos Augusto Bracho González (born 1964), Mexican politician
- Carlos Mijares Bracho (1930–2015), Mexican architect
- Coral Bracho (born 1951), Mexican poet
- Diana Bracho (born 1944), Mexican actress
- Edickson Contreras Bracho (born in 1990), Venezuelan diver
- Gabriel Bracho (1915–1995), Venezuelan artist
- Jesús Bracho (1910–1976), Mexican art director
- José Bracho (1928–2011), Venezuelan baseball player
- Juan Antonio de Tagle y Bracho (1685–1750), Spanish-born Peruvian aristocrat
- Julio Bracho (1909–1978), Mexican film director and screenwriter
- Luisa Lacal de Bracho (1874–1962), Spanish pianist, musicologist, and writer
- Silvino Bracho (born 1992), Venezuelan baseball player
