= Sui iuris =

Concept in jurisprudence

In Catholic canon law and secular law, sui iuris (/ˈsuːaɪ ˈdʒʊərɪs/), also spelled sui juris, refers to legal self-rule. The term "church sui iuris" is used in the Catholic Code of Canons of the Eastern Churches (CCEO) to denote the autonomous churches in Catholic communion.

== Etymology and spelling ==
The Latin sui iuris (the individual words meaning 'self' and 'law') corresponds to the Greek 'αὐτόνομος', from which the English word autonomy is derived.

== Catholic canon law ==
A church sui iuris is an aggregation of particular churches with distinct liturgical, spiritual, theological and canonical traditions that is recognized as a particular church within the Catholic Church. The term sui iuris denotes the relative autonomy of the Eastern Catholic Churches to keep up their patrimonial autonomous nature. The autonomy of these churches is relative in the sense that it is under the supreme authority of the Roman Pontiff.

By far the largest of the sui iuris churches is the Latin Church. Over that particular church, the pope exercises his papal authority, and the authority that in other particular churches belongs to a patriarch. He has, therefore, been referred to also as Patriarch of the West.

=== Patriarchal churches ===
A patriarchal church is a full-grown form of an Eastern Catholic church. It is 'a community of the Christian faithful joined together by' a Patriarchal hierarchy. The Patriarch together with the synod of bishops has the legislative, judicial and administrative powers within jurisdictional territory of the patriarchal church, without prejudice to those powers reserved, in the common law, to the Roman pontiff (CCEO 55-150). Among the Eastern Catholic Churches the following churches are of patriarchal status:

1. Coptic Catholic Church (1741): Cairo, Egypt
2. Maronite Church (union re-affirmed 1182): Bkerke, Lebanon, Cyprus, Jordan, Israel, Palestine, Egypt, Syria, Argentina, Brazil, United States, Australia, Canada, Mexico
3. Syriac Catholic Church (1781): Beirut, Lebanon, Iraq, Jordan, Kuwait, Palestine, Egypt, Sudan, Syria, Turkey, United States and Canada, Venezuela
4. Armenian Catholic Church (1742): Beirut, Lebanon, Iran, Iraq, Egypt, Syria, Turkey, Jordan, Palestine, Ukraine, France, Greece, Latin America, Argentina, Romania, United States, Canada, Eastern Europe
5. Chaldean Catholic Church (1552): Baghdad, Iraq, Iran, Lebanon, Egypt, Syria, Turkey, United States
6. Melkite Greek Catholic Church (definitively 1726): Damascus, Syria, Lebanon, Jordan, Israel, Palestine, Brazil, United States, Canada, Mexico, Iraq, Egypt and Sudan, Kuwait, Australia, Venezuela, Argentina

=== Major archiepiscopal churches ===
Major archiepiscopal churches are the oriental churches, governed by the major archbishops being assisted by the respective synod of bishops. These churches also have almost the same rights and obligations of Patriarchal Churches. A major archbishop is the metropolitan of a see determined or recognized by the Supreme authority of the Church, who presides over an entire Eastern Church sui iuris that is not distinguished with the patriarchal title. What is stated in common law concerning patriarchal Churches or patriarchs is understood to be applicable to major archiepiscopal churches or major archbishops, unless the common law expressly provides otherwise or it is evident from the nature of the matter" (CCEO.151, 152). Following are the Major Archiepiscopal Churches:

1. Syro-Malankara Catholic Church (1930): Thiruvananthapuram, India, United Arab Emirates, United States of America
2. Syro-Malabar Church (1923): Ernakulam, India, Middle East, Europe and America
3. Romanian Church United with Rome, Greek-Catholic (1697): Blaj, Romania, United States of America
4. Ukrainian Greek Catholic Church (1595): Kyiv, Ukraine, Poland, United States, Canada, Great Britain, Australia, Germany and Scandinavia, France, Brazil, Argentina

=== Metropolitan churches ===
A sui iuris church which is governed by a Metropolitan (Bishop) is called a metropolitan church sui iuris. "A Metropolitan Church sui iuris is presided over by the Metropolitan of a determined see who has been appointed by the Roman Pontiff and is assisted by a council of hierarchs according to the norm of law" (CCEO. 155§1). The Catholic metropolitan churches are the following:

1. Ethiopian Catholic Church (1846): Addis Ababa, Ethiopia.
2. Ruthenian Catholic Church (1646) – a sui juris metropolia, an eparchy, and an apostolic exarchate: United States (594,465), Canada, Ukraine, Czech Republic.
3. Slovak Greek Catholic Church (1646): Prešov, Slovakia.
4. Eritrean Catholic Church (2015): Asmara, Eritrea
5. Hungarian Greek Catholic Church (2015) – Hajdúdorog, Hungary

=== Other sui iuris churches ===
Other than the above-mentioned three forms of 'sui iuris churches there are some other sui iuris ecclesiastical communities. It is "a Church sui iuris which is neither patriarchal nor major archiepiscopal nor Metropolitan, and is entrusted to a hierarch who presides over it in accordance with the norm of common law and the particular law established by the Roman Pontiff" (CCEO. 174). The following churches are of this juridical status:

1. Albanian Greek Catholic Church (1628) – apostolic administration: Albania
2. Belarusian Greek Catholic Church (1596) – apostolic administration: Belarus
3. Bulgarian Greek Catholic Church (1861) – apostolic exarchate: Sofia, Bulgaria
4. Byzantine Catholic Church of Croatia and Serbia (1611) – an eparchy and an apostolic exarchate: Eparchy of Križevci for Croatia, Slovenia and Bosnia-Herzegovina, and Byzantine Catholic Apostolic Exarchate of Serbia
5. Greek Byzantine Catholic Church (1829) – two apostolic exarchates: Athens, Greece, Turkey
6. Italo-Albanian Catholic Church (never separated) – two eparchies and a territorial abbacy: Italy
7. Macedonian Greek Catholic Church (1918) – an eparchy: Skopje, Republic of Macedonia
8. Russian Greek Catholic Church (1905) – two apostolic exarchates, at present with no published hierarchs: Russia, China; currently about 34 parishes and communities scattered around the world, including 20 parishes and 5 missions in Russia itself, answering to bishops of other jurisdictions

== Secular law ==
In civil law, the phrase sui juris indicates legal competence, and refers to an adult who has the capacity to manage his or her own affairs. It is opposed to alieni juris, meaning one such as a minor or mentally disabled person who is legally incompetent and under the control of another. It also indicates a person capable of suing and/or being sued in a legal proceeding in his own name (suo nomine) without the need of an ad litem, that is, a court appointed representative, acting on behalf of a defendant, who is deemed to be incapable of representing themselves.

== See also ==
- Autocephaly
- List of Latin legal terms
- List of Latin phrases

== Sources ==
- Goudy, Henry (1911). "Roman Law" . In Chisholm, Hugh (ed.). Encyclopædia Britannica. Vol. 23 (11th ed.). Cambridge University Press. pp. 526–576.
- Vere, Pete, & Michael Trueman, Surprised by Canon Law, Volume 2: More Questions Catholics Ask About Canon Law (Cincinnati, Ohio: Servant Books/St. Anthony Messenger Press, 2007) ISBN 978-0-86716-749-8.
- Nedungatt, George, ed. (2002). A Guide to the Eastern Code: A Commentary on the Code of Canons of the Eastern Churches. Rome: Oriental Institute Press. ISBN 9788872103364.
