= George Nedungatt =

Indian Jesuit priest (1932–2022)

- Born: 21 December 1932; Peringuzha near Muvattupuzha, Travancore, British Raj
- Died: 26 October 2022 (aged 89); Christ Hall, Kozhikode, Kerala, India
- Occupations: Jesuit priest, professor, writer
- Writing career
- Genres: Theology, canon law
- Notable work: A Guide to the Eastern Code: Commentary on the Code of Canons of the Eastern Churches

George Nedungatt (21 December 1932 – 26 October 2022) was an Indian Jesuit priest of Syro-Malabar Catholic Church, and expert in Oriental Canon Law.

Nedungatt was born at Peringuzha near Muvattupuzha in India, as the second son of Kunjupappa and Mariam. He had three brothers. There were several priests and nuns among his aunts, uncles, and nephews.

== Jesuit formation ==
After his secondary education, he joined the Jesuit novitiate on 11 June 1950 at Christ Hall, where he had also his juniorate formation (1952-1954). He did his philosophy training (with a BA degree) at Sacred Heart College, Shembaganur (1954-1959). Then he did regency at St Joseph’s College, Trichy and Leo XIII High School, Alleppey (1960-1961). For theological studies, he went to St Mary’s College, Kurseong (1961-1965), where he was ordained a priest on 19 March 1964. He did his tertianship at La Providence, Kodaikanal (1966-1967). In the hands of Jesuit Superior General Pedro Arrupe, he made his final religious profession at the church of Il Gesù, Rome on 2 February 1968.

After his ordination, he was sent to the Pontifical Oriental Institute in Rome for higher studies in 1967, where he was awarded the licentiate (1969) and doctorate (1973) in canon law. He defended his doctoral thesis on 17 January 1973, entitled Covenant Law and Pastoral Ministry according to Aphrahat: Element for a Theologia Juris from Syrian Orient till 350 A.D, which he wrote under the guidance of Ivan Žužek SJ and Ignacio Ortiz de Urbina SJ.

== Professor and expert ==
For about 35 years (1973-2007), he taught canon law at the Oriental Institute, and served as the dean of its Faculty of Eastern Canon Law (1981-1987). There he taught Theology of Law, Philosophy of Law, Clerics and Laity, Magisterium, Juridical Methodology, and Canonical Latin. After his retirement from teaching, in order to complete some academic works, he remained in the Jesuit community of the Oriental Institute until 29 February 2012, on which day he returned to his province (Kerala). He was a visiting professor at the Institute of Oriental Canon Law (IOCL) of Dharmaram Vidya Kshetram Bangalore (India) from 1999 to 2012, and a resident teacher from 2012 to 2015. There he taught Theology of Law, Philosophy of Law and at times Latin. From the IOCL, he went to the Jesuit community of Kalady (India), where he continued his research and publication. In March 2022, he was transferred to Christ Hall, where he lived until his death. A scholar of international reputation, Nedungatt wrote several well-known books and articles. His competence in various areas is manifest in his works like The Laity and Church Temporalities: Appraisal of a Tradition.

Nedungatt was a consultor of the Pontifical Commission for the Revision of the Eastern Code of Canon Law (1973-1990). As the Relator of the committee on Clerics and Ecclesiastical Magisterium, he drafted its canons, many of which passed with little or no change, into the code. He has left his mark on the very heading of the eastern code. Nedungatt was consultor of the Congregation for the Eastern Churches, of the Congregation for the Causes of Saints, and of the Pontifical Council for Legislative Texts. He did significant work as the president of the Apostolic Tribunal in the cause of St Alphonsa; and as the postulator in the cause of St Mariam Thresia. He worked for some time as the postulator of the causes of the Servant of God Joseph Vithayathil and of St Devasahayam Pillai, among others.

He spoke English, Italian, French, German, Spanish, and Portuguese, besides own mother tongue Malayalam. For purposes of research, he could handle ancient languages like Sanskrit, Syriac, Hebrew and Greek. Many Jesuits know him as their Latin professor. His language proficiency opened before him a wide world of knowledge and made his works erudite.

Very few students chose Nedungatt as the director of their doctoral dissertation. He was demanding and wanted his students to work hard as he did. Thirteen students wrote doctoral dissertation under his guidance.

From the stipends he received from priestly ministry in Germany and Italy, with the permission of his superiors, he financed houses built for the poor in his home parish.

== Personal life and death ==
Nedungatt died at Christ Hall, Kozhikode, Kerala, India on 26 October 2022, at the age of 89, and was buried in the Jesuit cemetery of Christ Hall on 28 October.

== Major works ==
Nedungatt published many books and hundreds of articles in various theological journals.

- The Spirit of the Eastern Code, Bangalore, 1992.
- The Council in Trullo Revisited, edited together with Michael Featherstone (Kanonika 6), Rome, 1995.
- Laity and Church Temporalities: Appraisal of a Tradition, Bangalore, 2000.
- The Synod of Diamper Revisited, ed., (Kanonika 9), Rome, 2001.
- A Guide to the Eastern Code: Commentary on the Code of Canons of the Eastern Churches, ed. (Kanonika 10), Rome, 2002.
- Quest for the Historical Thomas Apostle of India: A Re-reading of the Evidence, Bangalore, 2008.
- Renewal of Life and Law: An Indian Contribution (Dharmaram Canonical Studies 10), Bangalore, 2015.
- Covenant Life, Law and Ministry according to Aphrahat (Kanonika 26), Rome, 2018.
- Theology of Law (Kanonika 28), Rome, 2019.

== Bibliography ==
- A Festschrift was published in his honour in 2003: The Syro-Malabar Church since the Eastern Code (Ed.: Francis Eluvathingal), 2003.
