= Ivan Žužek =

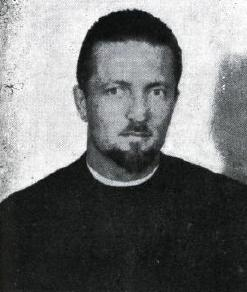
Ivan Žužek

Ivan Žužek (2 December 1924, Ljubljana – 2 February 2004, Rome), was a Slovenian Jesuit priest and Canonist. He was the General Secretary of Pontifical Commission for the Revision of Eastern Code (CCEO).

== Early life ==
Žužek was born in Ljubljana, capital city of the Republic of Slovenija, on 2 December 1924. Ivan Žužek had a dramatic life story. As a young man in Nazi-occupied Slovenija, he managed to escape to England, only to be put on a train by British authorities for return to Eastern Europe. Along the way he jumped out and ended up in Italy, where he joined the Jesuits.

== In Society of Jesus ==
He was a member of the Society of Jesus. He was the professor of the Faculty of Canon Law at the Pontifical Oriental Institute, Rome. He was the rector of the same Institute from 1967 to 1973.

== Codification of CCEO ==
When Pontifical Commission for the Revision of Eastern Code (CCEO) was instituted in June 1973, he was appointed to the post of General Secretary, and continued in this post till the dissolution of the commission after the promulgation of the Codex Canonum Ecclesiarum Orientalium (CCEO). At the beginning of 1991 he was appointed Consultor to the Pontifical Council for the Interpretation of legislative Texts. In this Council he served as Under-Secretary until his retirement in June 1995. However he has remained a consultor to the same Council as well as being a consultor to the Congregation for the Oriental Churches.

His main works are: Index Analyticus Codicis Canonum Ecclesiarum Orientalium and Understanding the Eastern Code.

== See also ==
- CCEO
- Pontifical Oriental Institute
