= Grand Masters and Lieutenancies of the Order of the Holy Sepulchre =

Coat of arms of His Beatitude Fouad Twal, Patriarch Emeritus, charged with the red Jerusalem cross, associated with the order.

The article offers an index of the Grand Magisterium including Grand Masters and the Lieutenancies of the Order of the Holy Sepulchre.

== Heraldry ==
The Order of the Holy Sepulchre and the Sovereign Military Order of Malta are the only two institutions whose insignia may be displayed in a clerical coat of arms. Laypersons have no such restrictions.

Heraldry of the Order of the Holy Sepulchre
Coat of arms	Office	Description
	Clerics	Clerics quarter their Arms with those of the Order.
	Patriarch Grand Prior and Assessor	The Arms of the Order are borne in Chief.
	Knights / Dames of the Collar, Lieutenants, members of the Grand Magisteruim, and Grand Priors	The Arms are impaled with the Arms of the Order to the dexter.
	Lay members of titled nobility	The Arms of lay members with recognised noble titles (as with those of Archbishops, Bishops and Prelates) are placed on the Cross of the Order, a privilege which is not transmissible.
Hierarchy of the Order
	Cardinal Grand Master	The Cardinal Grand Master's Arms are quartered with those of the Order. The Galero and cross of a Cardinal are used, with the Mantle of the Order surmounted with the helm and crest of the Order, and with the relevant external ornaments.
	Patriarch Grand Prior and the Assessor	The Patriarch Grand Prior and the Assessor bear the Arms of the Order in the chief of his Arms, with the relevant external ornaments.
	Knight / Dame of the Collar, Lieutenant, member of the Grand Magisterium, and Grand Prior	The Arms are impaled with the Arms of the Order to the dexter. Knights of the Collar surround the Arms with the Collar of the Order.
	Knight / Dame Grand Cross	The Arms are surrounded with a black ribbon from which is suspended a trophy and the Cross of the Order.
	Knight / Dame Commander with Star / Grand Officer	The Cross of the Order is suspended from a trophy on a black ribbon coming from the sides of the shield.
	Knight / Dame Commander	The Cross of the Order is suspended from a black ribbon limited to the base of the shield.
	Knight / Dame	The Cross of the Order is suspended from the shield with a simple black knot.

== Grand masters ==
In 1496, Pope Alexander VI vested the office of Grand Master in the Papacy where it remained until 1949. From 1949, the following Cardinals have held the office:

Cardinal Grand Masters of the Order of the Holy Sepulchre
Years	Coat of arms	Name	Years	Coat of arms	Name
1949–1960		Nicola Canali	1995–2007		Carlo Furno
1960–1972		Eugène Tisserant	2007–2011		John Patrick Foley
1972–1988		Maximilien de Furstenberg	2011–2019		Edwin O'Brien
1988–1995		Giuseppe Caprio	2019–		Fernando Filoni

== Grand magisterium ==
The officers of the grand magisterium are based in Rome.

- Pierbattista Pizzaballa, Latin Patriarch of Jerusalem and Cardinal-Priest of Sant'Onofrio al Gianicolo, Grand Prior of the Order
- Tommaso Caputo, Prelate of Pompei, Assessor of the Order
- Count Leonardo Visconti di Modrone, Governor General
- Shawn Cleary, Vice-Governor General for North America
- Jean-Pierre Glutz-Ruchti, Vice-Governor General for Europe
- John Secker, Vice-Governor General for Asia and the Pacific region
- Enric Mas, Vice-Governor General for Latin America
- Alfredo Bastianelli, Chancellor of the Order
- Adriano Paccanelli, Master of Ceremonies of the Order
- Severio Petrillo, Treasurer of the Order
- Antonio Franco, Assessor of Honour
- Giuseppe Lazzarotto, Assessor of Honour

The offices of the grand magisterium are situated in the headquarters in Rome.

=== Lieutenancies ===
Latin America	Europe		North America	Asia, the Pacific, and Africa
Argentina: Lieutenant: Gustavo Arigós Calderón; Grand Prior: Alejandro Daniel Giorgi, Auxiliary Bishop of Buenos Aires Brazil - Rio de Janeiro: Lieutenant: Isis Terezinha Cunha Penido; Grand Prior: Orani João Tempesta, Archbishop of São Sebastião do Rio de Janeiro Brazil - São Paulo: Lieutenant: Manuel R. Tavares de Almeida Filho; Grand Prior: Odilo Scherer, Archbishop of São Paulo Colombia: Lieutenant: Maria Adriana Mayol de Rojas; Grand Prior: Luis Jose Rueda Aparicio, Archbishop of Bogota Dominican Republic: Magistral Delegate: Juana Josefina Domínguez de Jesús; Grand Prior: Francisco Ozoria Acosta, Archbishop of Santo Domingo Mexico: Lieutenant: Guillermo Macias Graue; Grand Prior: Carlos Aguiar Retes, Archbishop Primate of Mexico Puerto Rico: Lieutenant: Enrique Vasquez; Grand Prior: Rubén González Medina, Bishop of Ponce Venezuela: Lieutenant: Ramón Eduardo Tello; Grand Prior: Sede vacante	Austria: Lieutenant: Andreas Leiner; Grand Prior: Raimund Schreier, O.Praem., Abbott Emeritus of Wilten Abbey Belgium: Lieutenant: Jean-Pierre Fierens; Grand Prior: Guy Harpigny Croatia: Magistral Delegate: Claude Grbeša; Grand Prior: Josip Bozanić, Archbishop of Zagreb Czech Republic: Magistral Delegate: Tomáš Parma; Grand Prior: Jan Graubner Archbishop of Prague England and Wales: Lieutenant: John McNally; Grand Prior: John Wilson, Archbishop of Southwark Finland: Lieutenant: Juha-Pekka Vilhelm Lindholm; Grand Prior: Raimo Goyarrola, Archbishop of Helsinki France: Lieutenant: Jean-Marie Faugère; Grand Prior: Bernard-Nicolas Aubertin, Archbishop of Tours Germany: Lieutenant: Michael Schnieders; Grand Prior: Reinhard Marx, Archbishop of Munich and Freising Gibraltar: Lieutenant: John A. Gaggero; Grand Prior: Carmel Zammit, Bishop of Gibraltar Hungary: Lieutenant: Béla Jungbert; Grand Prior: Péter Erdő, Archbishop of Esztergom-Budapest Ireland: Lieutenant: Peter Durnin; Grand Prior: Seán Brady, Archbishop Emeritus of Armagh Italy - Central: Lieutenant: Saverio Petrillo; Grand Prior: Lino Fumagalli, Bishop of Viterbo Italy - Central Apennines: Lieutenant: Giovanni Ricasoli - Firidolfi; Grand Prior: Fausto Tardelli, Bishop of Pistoia Italy - Adriatic South: Lieutenant: Rocco Saltino; Grand Prior: Giuseppe Satriano, Archbishop of Bari-Bitonto Italy - Tyrrhenian South: Lieutenant: Giovanni Napolitano; Grand Prior: Beniamino Depalma, Bishop Emeritus of Nola Italy - Sardinia: Lieutenant: Efisio Luigi Aste; Grand Prior: Giuseppe Baturi, Archbishop of Cagliari Italy - North: Lieutenant: Roberto Giuliano Protto; Grand Prior: Maurizio Malvestiti, Roman Catholic Diocese of Lodi Italy - Sicily: Lieutenant: Giovanni Russo; Grand Prior: Paolo Romeo, Archbishop Emeritus of Palermo	Latvia: Lieutenant: Janis Smelters; Grand Prior: Zbigņevs Stankevičs, Archbishop of Riga Luxembourg: Lieutenant: Guy Schleder; Grand Prior: Fernand Franck, Archbishop Emeritus of Luxembourg Malta: Lieutenant: Roberto Buontempo; Grand Prior: Charles J Scicluna, Archbishop of Malta Monaco: Lieutenant: Michel-Yves Mourou; Grand Prior: Dominique-Marie David, Archbishop of Monaco Netherlands: Lieutenant: Michael L. M. Brenninkmeijer; Grand Prior: Cornelis van den Hout, Bishop of Groningen-Leeuwarden Norway: Magistral Delegate: Helene Lund; Grand Prior: Bernt Ivar Eidsvig, Bishop of Oslo Poland: Lieutenant: Józef Dąbrowski; Grand Prior: Kazimierz Nycz, Archbishop of Warsaw Portugal: Lieutenant: Nuno Michael Gabriel Rafael Maria de Bragança van Uden; Grand Prior: Manuel Clemente, Patriarch Emeritus of Lisbon Russia: Lieutenant: Yaroslav Ternovskiy; Grand Prior: Paolo Pezzi, Metropolitan Archbishop of Moscow Scotland: Lieutenant: Joseph d'Inverno; Grand Prior: Leo Cushley, Archbishop of St Andrews and Edinburgh Slovakia; Magistral Delegate: Miroslav Gieci; Grand Prior: Ján Orosch, Archbishop of Trnva Slovenia: Lieutenant: Mihael Vrhunec; Grand Prior: Stanislav Zore, Archbishop of Ljubljana Spain - East: Lieutenant: Juan Carlos de Balle y Comas; Grand Prior: Lluis Martinez Sistach, Archbishop emeritus of Barcelona Spain - West: Lieutenant: José Carlos Sanjuán Monforte; Grand Prior: Francisco César García Magán, Auxiliary Bishop of Toledo Sweden-Denmark: Lieutenant: Jørgen Boesen; Grand Prior: Czeslaw Kozon, Bishop of Copenhagen Switzerland and Liechtenstein: Lieutenant: Donata Maria Krethlow-Benziger; Grand Prior: Charles Morerod OP, Bishop of Lausanne, Geneva and Fribourg	Canada - Atlantic: Lieutenant: William Sweet; Grand Prior: Brian Joseph Dunn, Archbishop of Halifax-Yarmouth Canada - Montreal: Lieutenant: Luc Harvey; Grand Prior: Christian Lépine, Archbishop of Montreal Canada - Quebec: Lieutenant: Claude R. SAUCIER; Grand Prior: Gérald Cyprien Lacroix, Archbishop of Quebec and Primate of Canada Canada - Toronto: Lieutenant: Colin Saldanha; Grand Prior: Frank Leo, Archbishop of Toronto Canada - Vancouver: Lieutenant: Marilyn L. Martin; Grand Prior: Richard W. Smith, Archbishop of Vancouver United States - Eastern: Lieutenant: Michael J. L. La Civilta; Grand Prior: Timothy Dolan, Archbishop of New York United States - Middle Atlantic: Lieutenant: Mark E. Chopko; Grand Prior: William Lori, Archbishop of Baltimore United States - North Central: Lieutenant: Thomas M. Olejniczak; Grand Prior: Blase Cupich, Archbishop of Chicago United States - Northeastern: Lieutenant: Gerard J. Foley; Grand Prior: Sean Patrick O'Malley, Archbishop of Boston United States - Northwestern: Lieutenant: Donald Damian Harmata; Grand Prior: Jaime Soto, Bishop of Sacramento United States - Northern: Lieutenant: Shawn Timothy Cleary; Grand Prior: Joseph Fred Naumann, Archbishop of Kansas City in Kansas United States - Western: Lieutenant: Margaret A. Romano; Grand Prior: Jose H. Gomez, Archbishop of Los Angeles United States - Southeastern: Lieutenant: Joseph A Marino Sr. Grand Prior: Gregory M. Aymond, Archbishop of New Orleans United States - Southwestern: Lieutenant: Lois Katharine Folger; Grand Prior: Daniel DiNardo, Archbishop of Galveston-Houston	Australia - New South Wales: Lieutenant: François Kunc SC; Grand Prior: Anthony Fisher OP, Archbishop of Sydney Australia - Western Australia: Lieutenant: Kevin Susai; Grand Prior: Timothy Costelloe SDB, Archbishop of Perth Australia - Queensland: Lieutenant: Peter Michael Greene; Grand Prior: Mark Coleridge, Archbishop of Brisbane Australia - South Australia: Lieutenant: David Francis McCabe; Grand Prior: Patrick O'Regan, Archbishop of Adelaide Australia - Victoria: Lieutenant: Kevin Christopher Bailey; Grand Prior: Peter Comensoli, Archbishop of Melbourne Guam: Magistral Delegate: Rodney J. Jacob; Grand Prior: Sede vacante Malaysia - Penang: Lieutenant: John Luis Shian Liang Chen; Grand Prior: Sebastian Francis, Bishop of Penang New Zealand: Magistral Delegate: Carleen Anne Blucher; Grand Prior: Stephen Lowe, Bishop of Auckland Philippines: Lieutenant: Jose Cuisia; Grand Prior: Jose Advincula OP, Archbishop of Manila Taiwan: Lieutenant: John Anales Lee; Grand Prior: Joseph Ti-Kang, Archbishop emeritus of Taipei Southern Africa: Magistral Delegate: Juan Luis Cabral; Grand Prior: Stephen Brislin, Archbishop of Johannesburg
Source: Official website

== See also ==
- Grand master (order)
- Grand Master of the Teutonic Knights
- Grand Master of the Order of Saint Lazarus
- List of grand masters of the Knights Hospitaller
- List of grand masters of the Knights Templar
