= Charterhouse of Las Fuentes =

Monastery in Aragon, Spain

Coordinates: 41.74°N 0.29°W

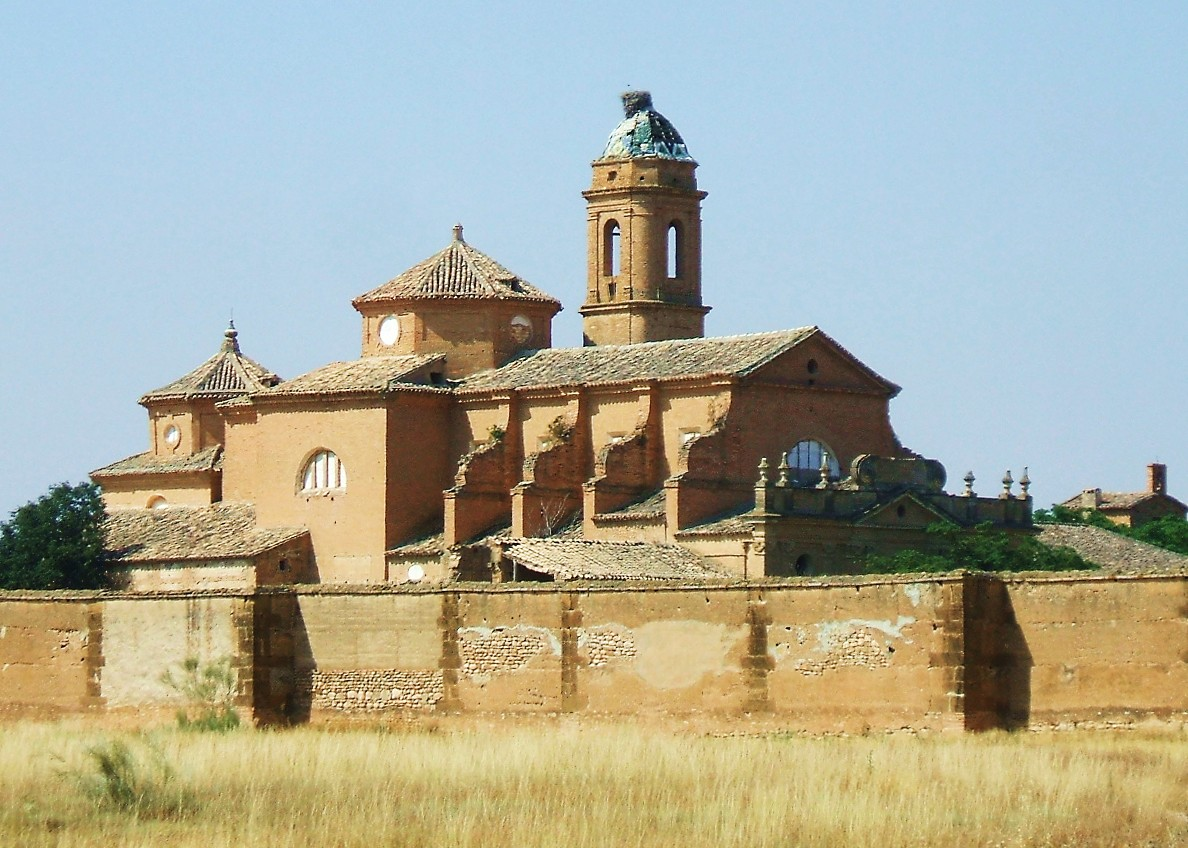

The Charterhouse of Las Fuentes (Spanish: Cartuja de Nuestra Señora de las Fuentes) is a Carthusian monastery, or charterhouse, in Aragon, Spain. It was established in 1507.

== See also ==
- "Into Great Silence"—an award-winning documentary on the Carthusian monks
- List of Carthusian monasteries
- Monastic Family of Bethlehem, of the Assumption of the Virgin and of Saint Bruno
