= Deir Rafat =

Deir Rafat: דיר ראפאת (Hebrew); دير رفات (Arabic)
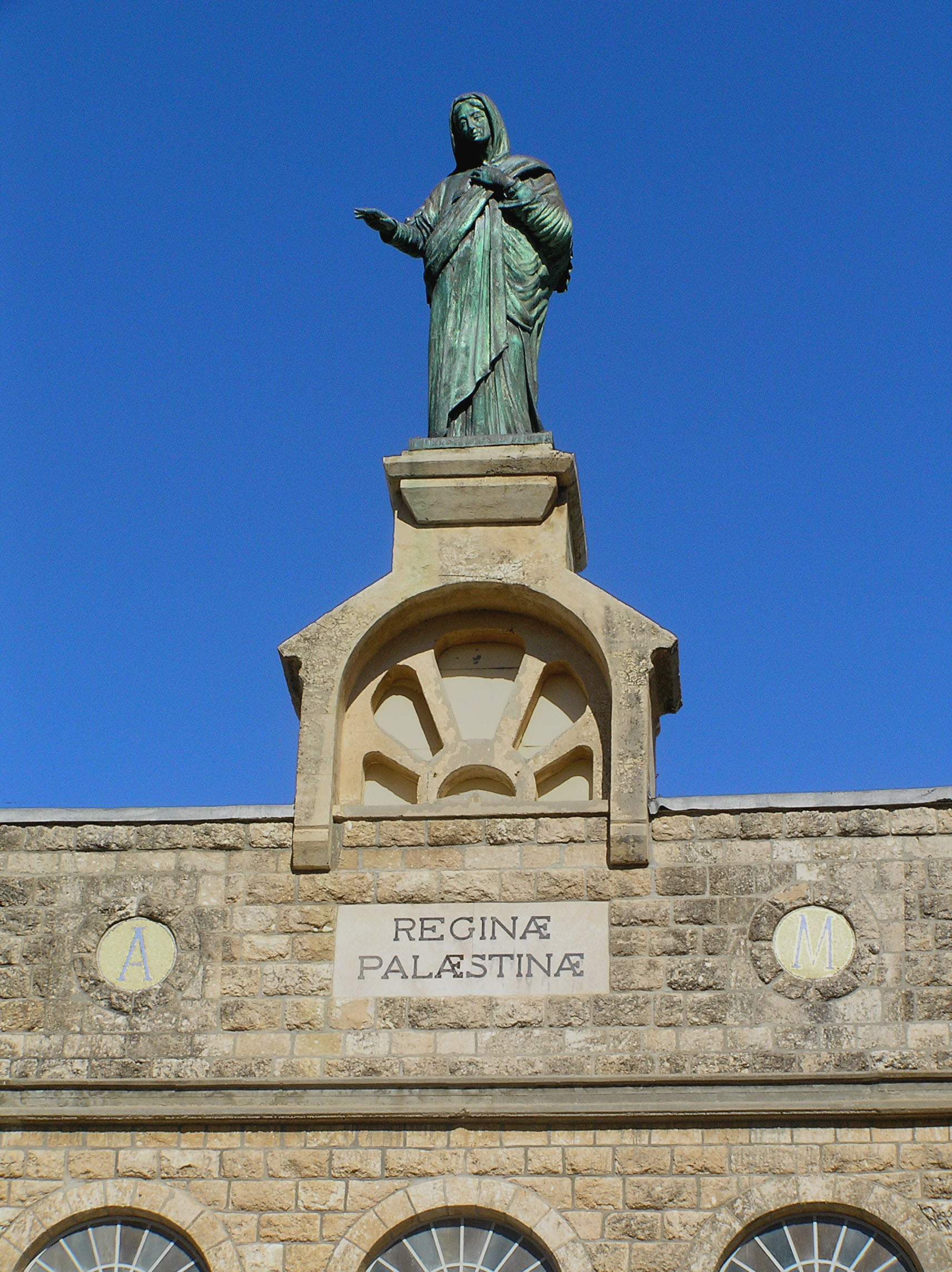

- Location within Jerusalem District
- Coordinates: 31°46′34″N 34°56′47″E
- Grid position: 144/131 PAL
- Country: Israel
- District: Jerusalem
- Council: Mateh Yehuda
- Founded: 1927
- Founder: Luigi Barlassina
- Population (2024): 86

Deir Rafat (Arabic: دير رفات, Hebrew: דיר ראפאת), also known as the Shrine of Our Lady Queen of Palestine and of the Holy Land, is a Catholic monastery in central Israel. Located to the north-west of Beit Shemesh, between Givat Shemesh and kibbutz Tzora to the south and Kfar Uria to the north, it falls under the jurisdiction of Mateh Yehuda Regional Council. In 2024, it had a population of 86. The shrine is dedicated to the Marian devotion of Our Lady Queen of Palestine.

== History ==
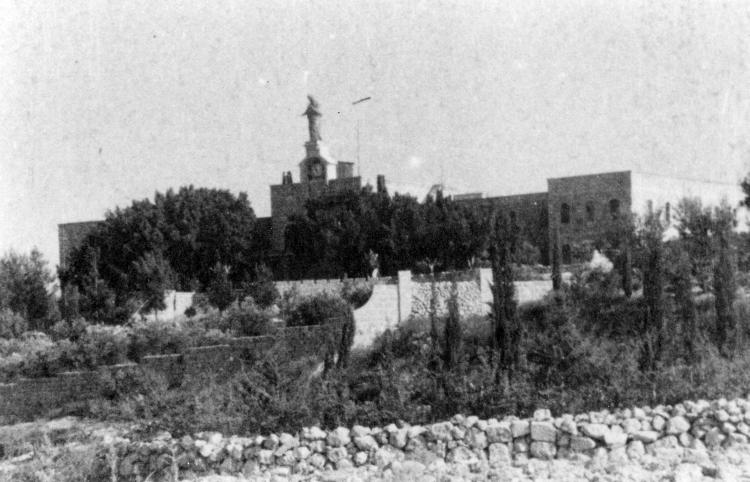
Deir Rafat Monastery, 1948

The monastery was established in 1927, under the then British Mandate of Palestine, by the Latin Patriarch Luigi Barlassina and contained a boarding school, an orphanage and convent. In 1933 it was approved to add to the title the words "Queen of Palestine". The façade of the convent church bears the Latin inscription "Reginæ Palæstinæ", lit. "to the Queen of Palestine", and carries a 6-metre statue of the Virgin Mary. The church ceiling is decorated with a painting showing angels carrying banners with the first words of the Hail Mary prayer in 280 languages. Since 2009, the convent is in the care of the female branch of the Catholic order known as "the Monastic Family of Bethlehem, of the Assumption of the Virgin and of Saint Bruno", called the monastic Sisters of Bethlehem. Currently the convent is running a guest house and a retreat center for believers and Holy Land pilgrims.

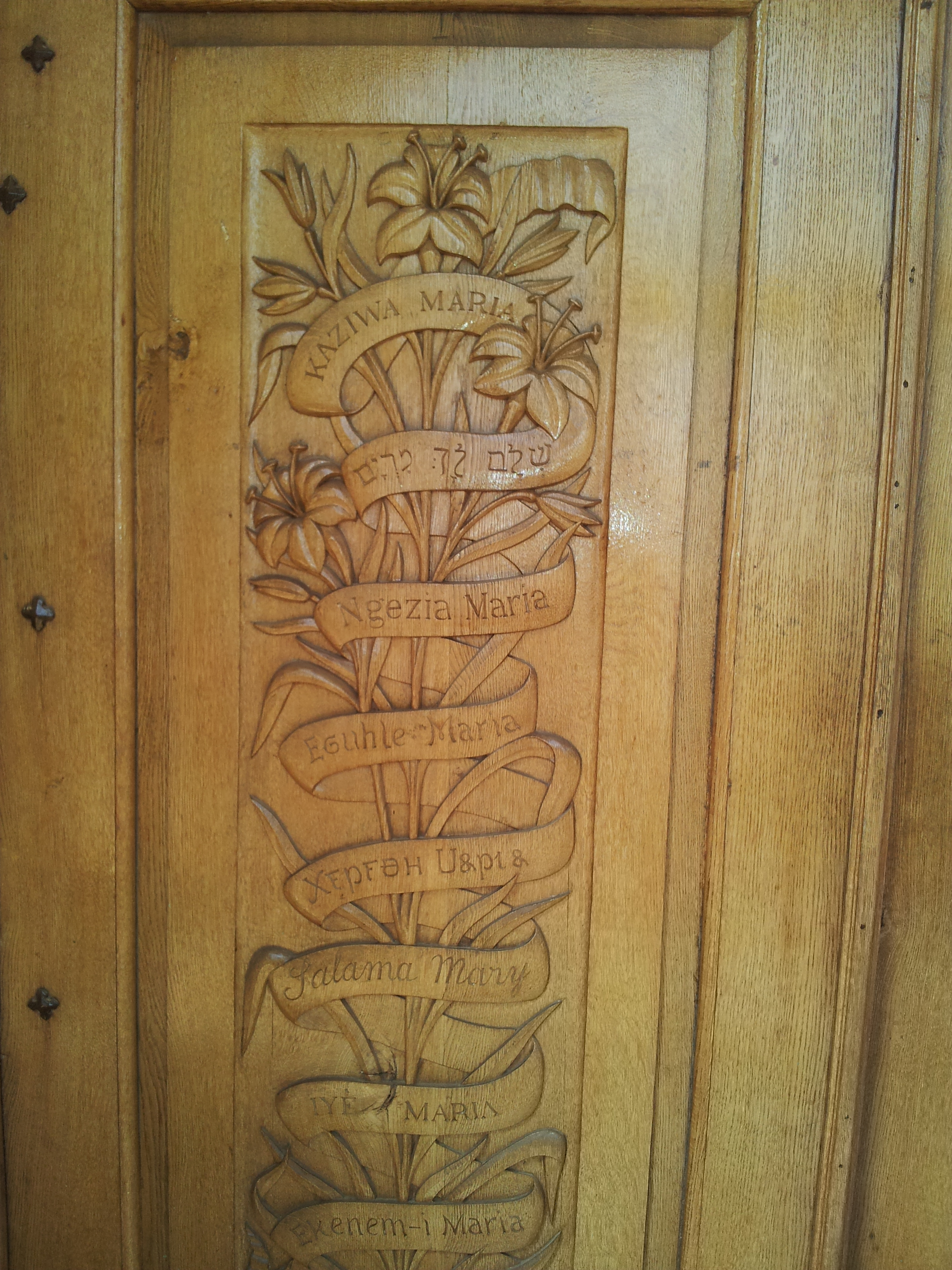
Wooden doors with "Ave Maria" carving in different languages

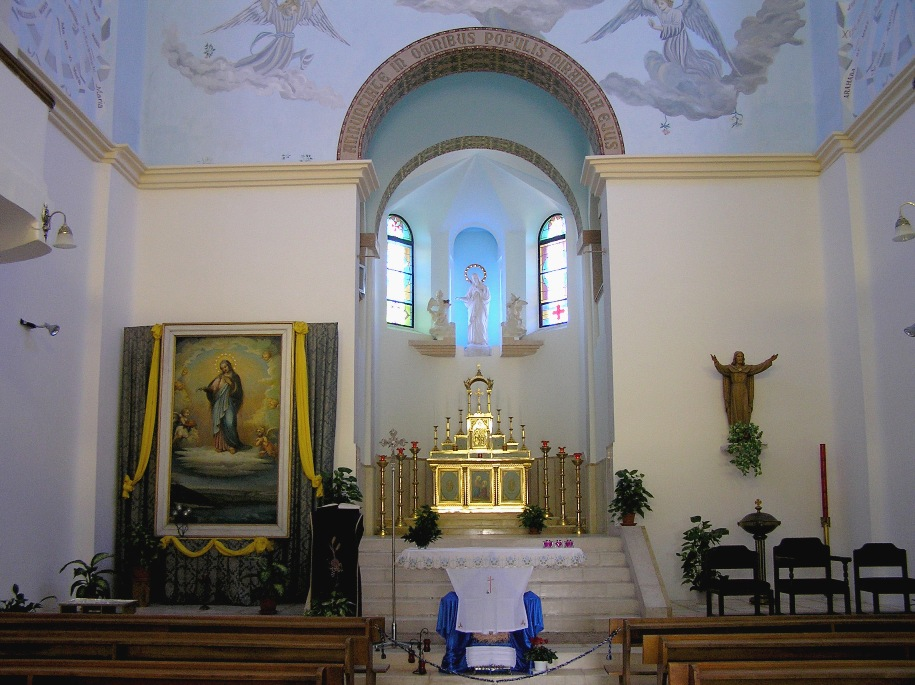
Church interior

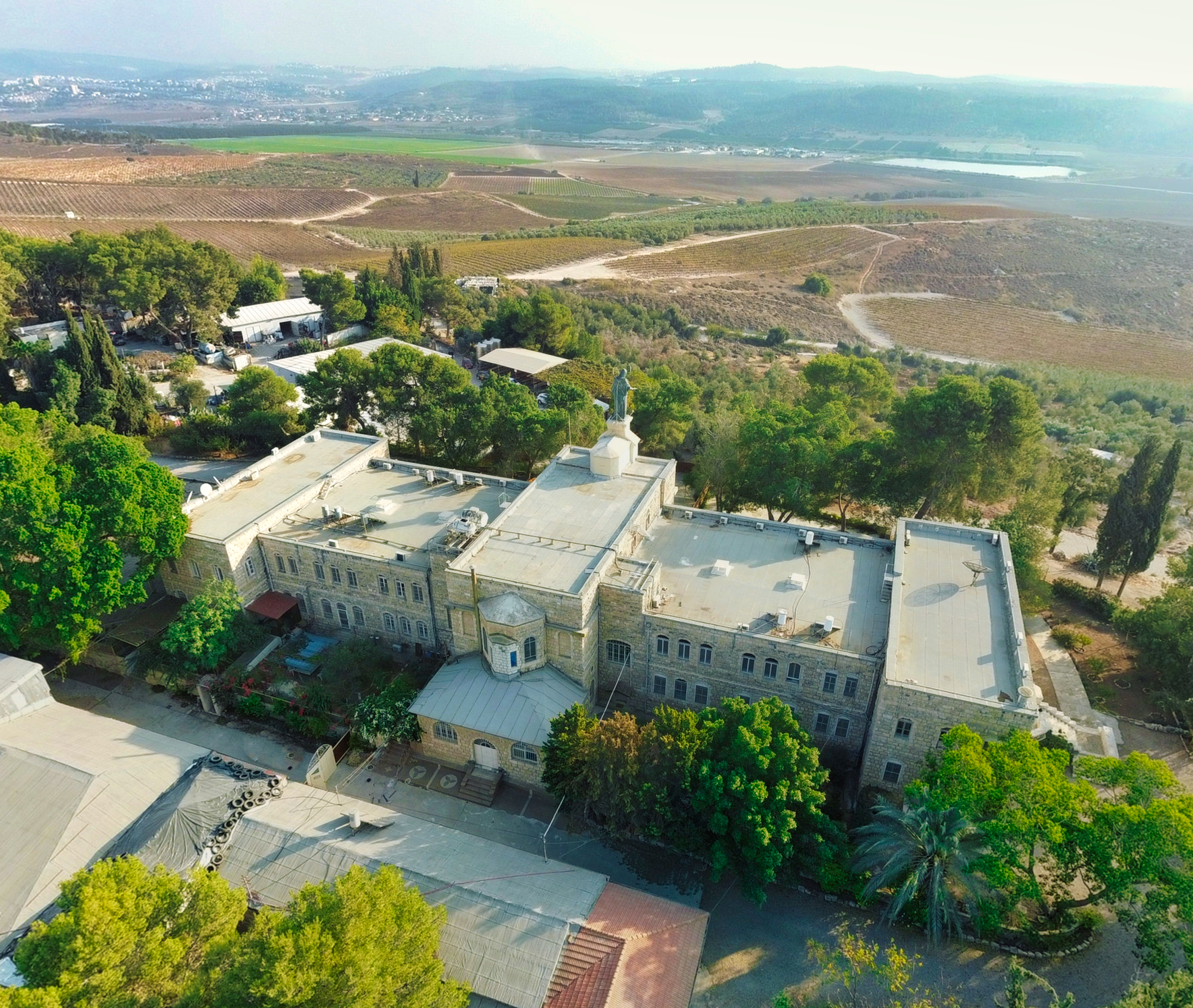
Deir Rafat

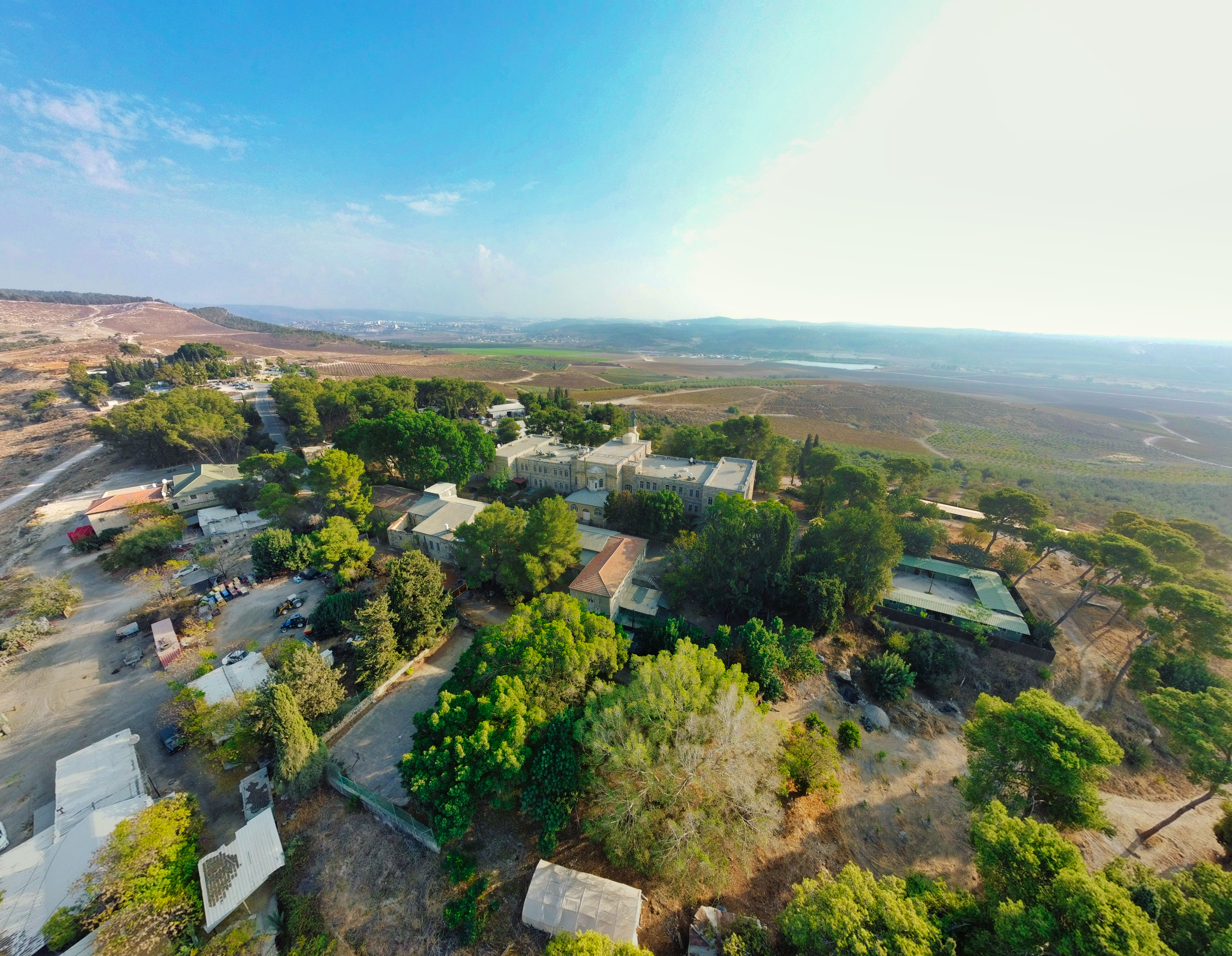
Deir Rafat compound
