= Camassei =

Camassei is a surname. Notable people with the surname include:

- Andrea Camassei (1602–1649), Italian Baroque painter and engraver
- Filippo Camassei (1848–1921), Italian cardinal
