= Saint-Honoré d'Eylau =

Roman Catholic churches in Paris, France

Eglise Saint-Honoré-d'Eylau
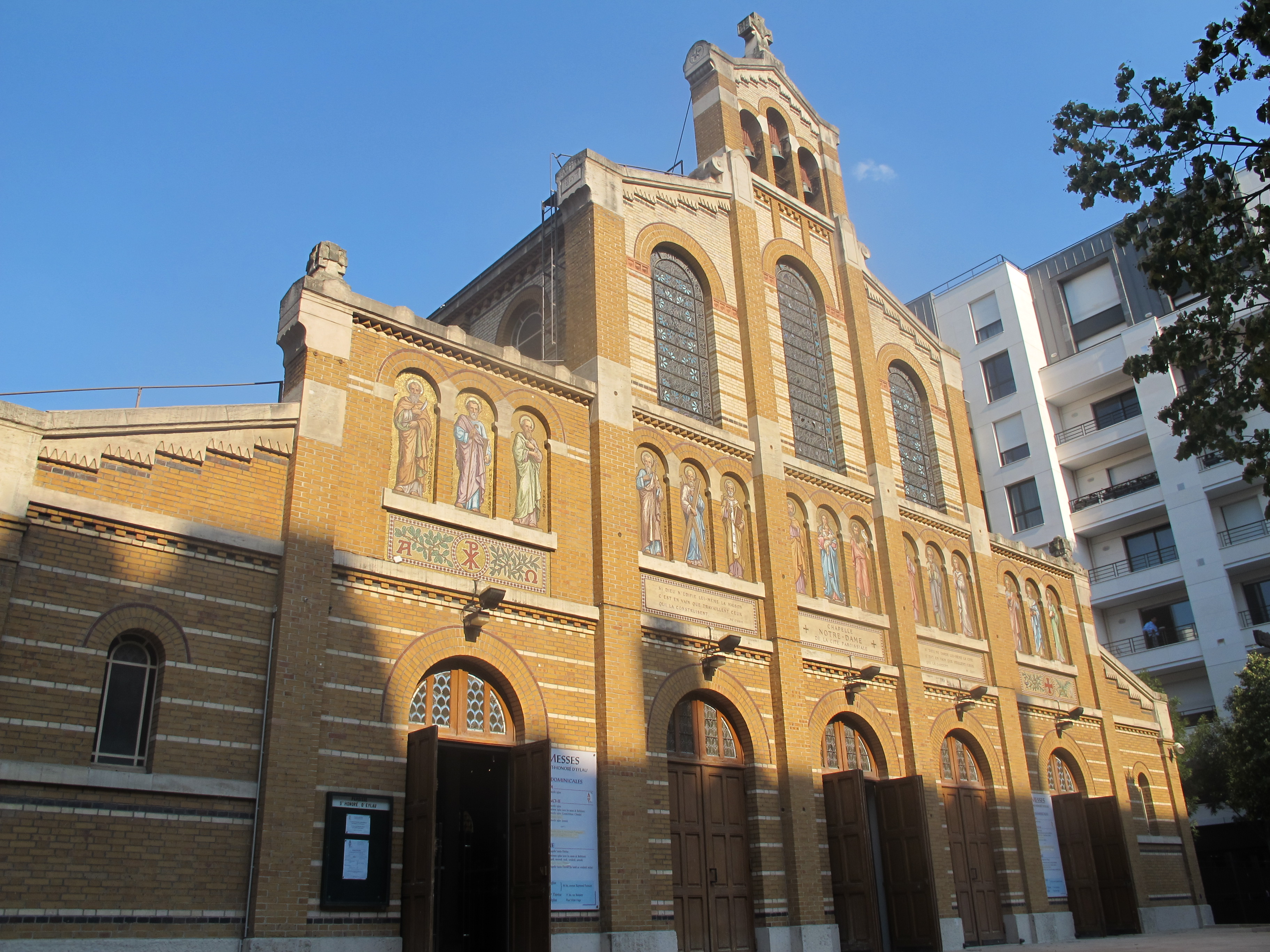
- Saint-Honore d'Eylau New Church

Religion
- Affiliation: Roman Catholic
- Diocese: Roman Catholic Archdiocese of Paris
- Region: Île-de-France
- Rite: Latin Rite
- Status: k

Location
- Location: Paris, France
- Interactive map of Eglise Saint-Honoré-d'Eylau

Architecture
- Completed: 1852 (old), 1896 (new)

Saint-Honoré d'Eylau refers to two neighbouring Roman Catholic churches at 64 bis Avenue Raymond Poincare in the 16th arrondissement of Paris. The old church was built in 1852, the new church in 1896. The churches were once connected, and both report to the Archbishop of Paris, but their roles are now entirely different. The new church is the parish church, while the old church is now the chapel of a monastic order.

== New church ==
The new church was built in 1896. It was intended to be temporary, until the construction of a larger church, which was never built. The architect, Paul Merbeau, was greatly influenced by the Paris Exposition Universelle (1889), particularly the use of modern iron structures in Exposition buildings, which allowed greater strength and speed of construction. The supporting iron columns and arches in the church, resembling those of Gothic cathedrals, are painted white and present a dramatic scene. The iron arches and pillars are slender, opening up the view of the interior. The church has an abundance of Art Deco windows and decoration.

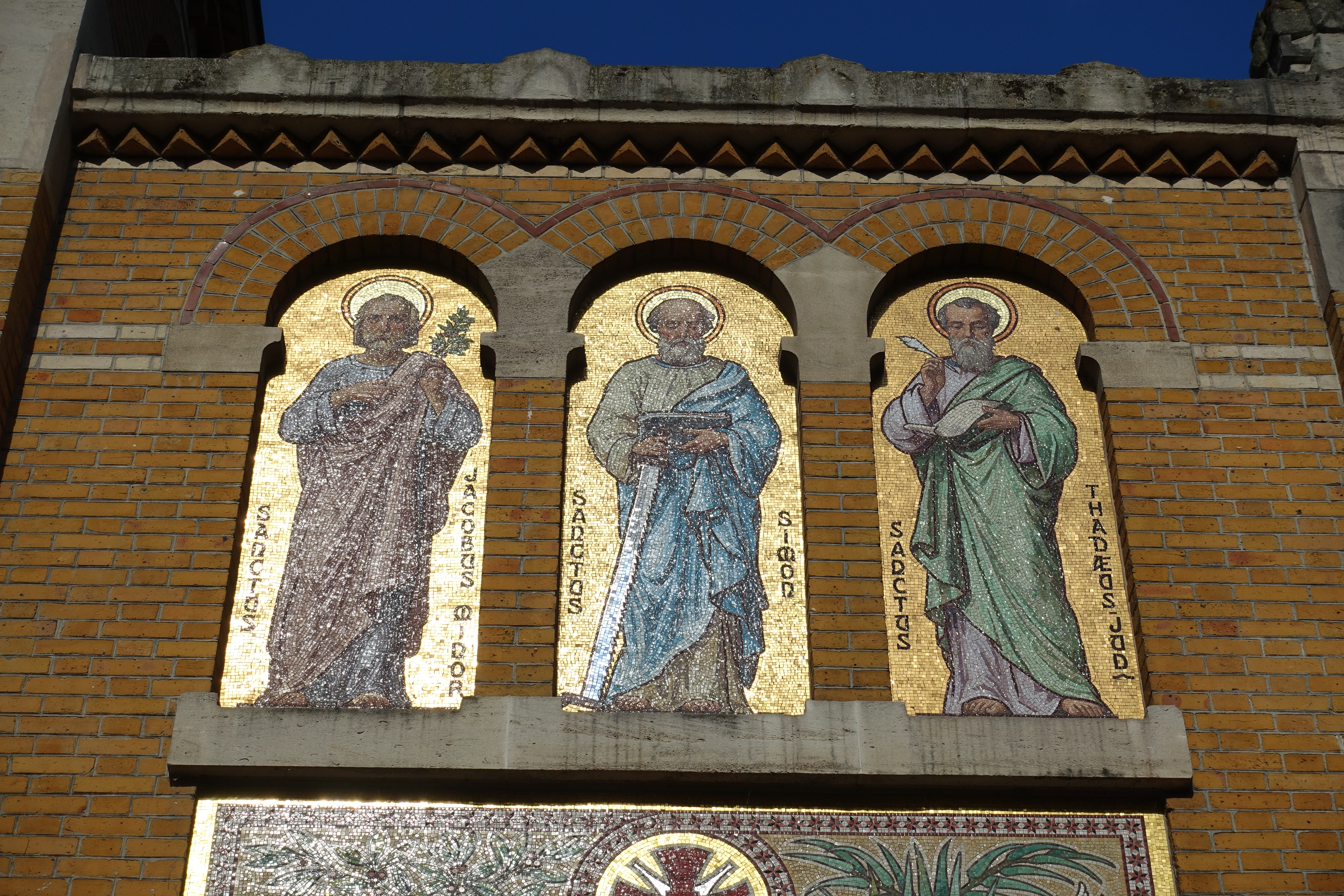
Facade decoration

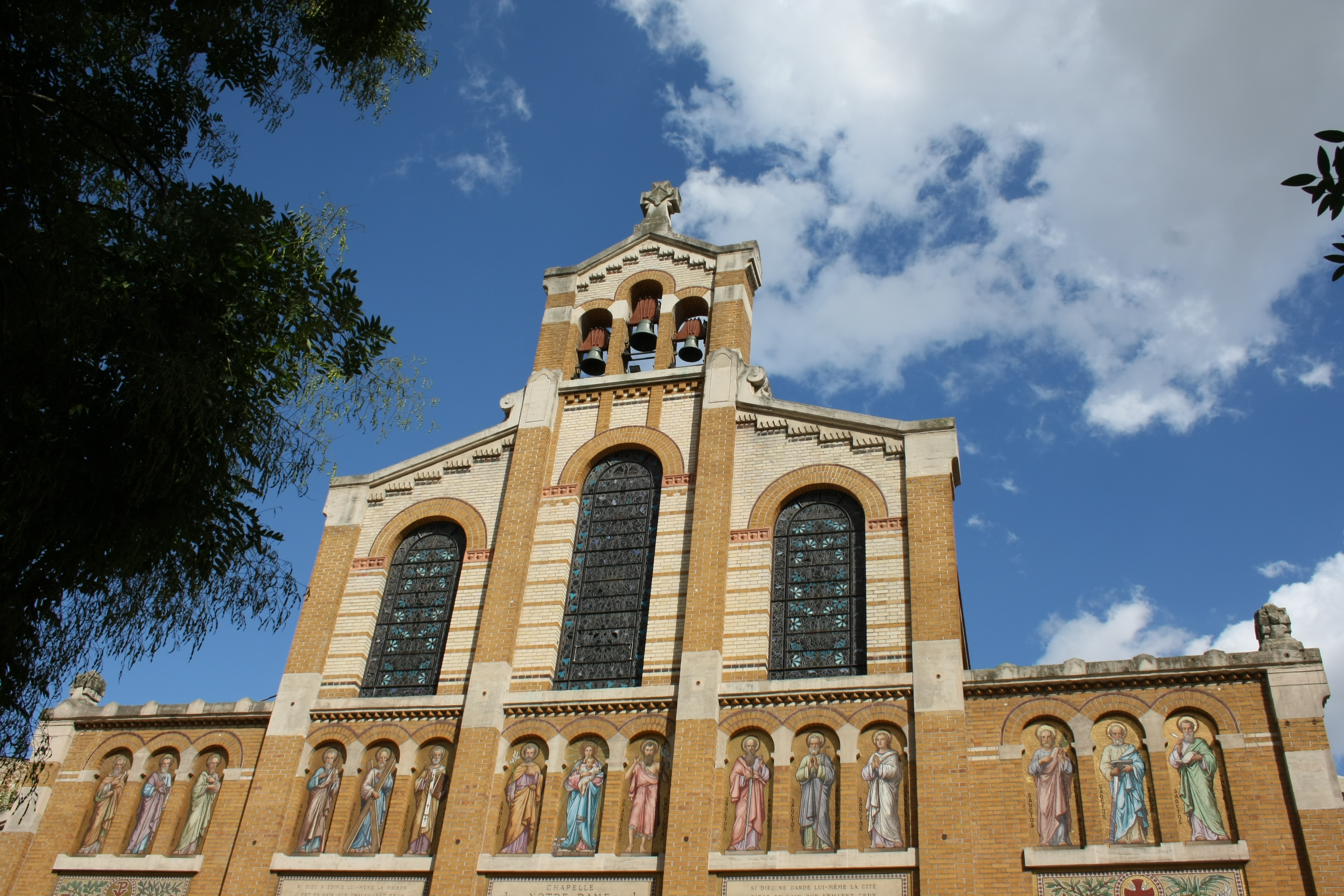

=== Interior ===
The interior has the elements of a classic Gothic church; the colonnades and the arched ceiling, but rendered with concrete and iron and brightly coloured. The dome is 26.5 meters high and 12 meters in diameter. The architecture of the dome was designed by George Gauidbert to include four windows on its lower level.

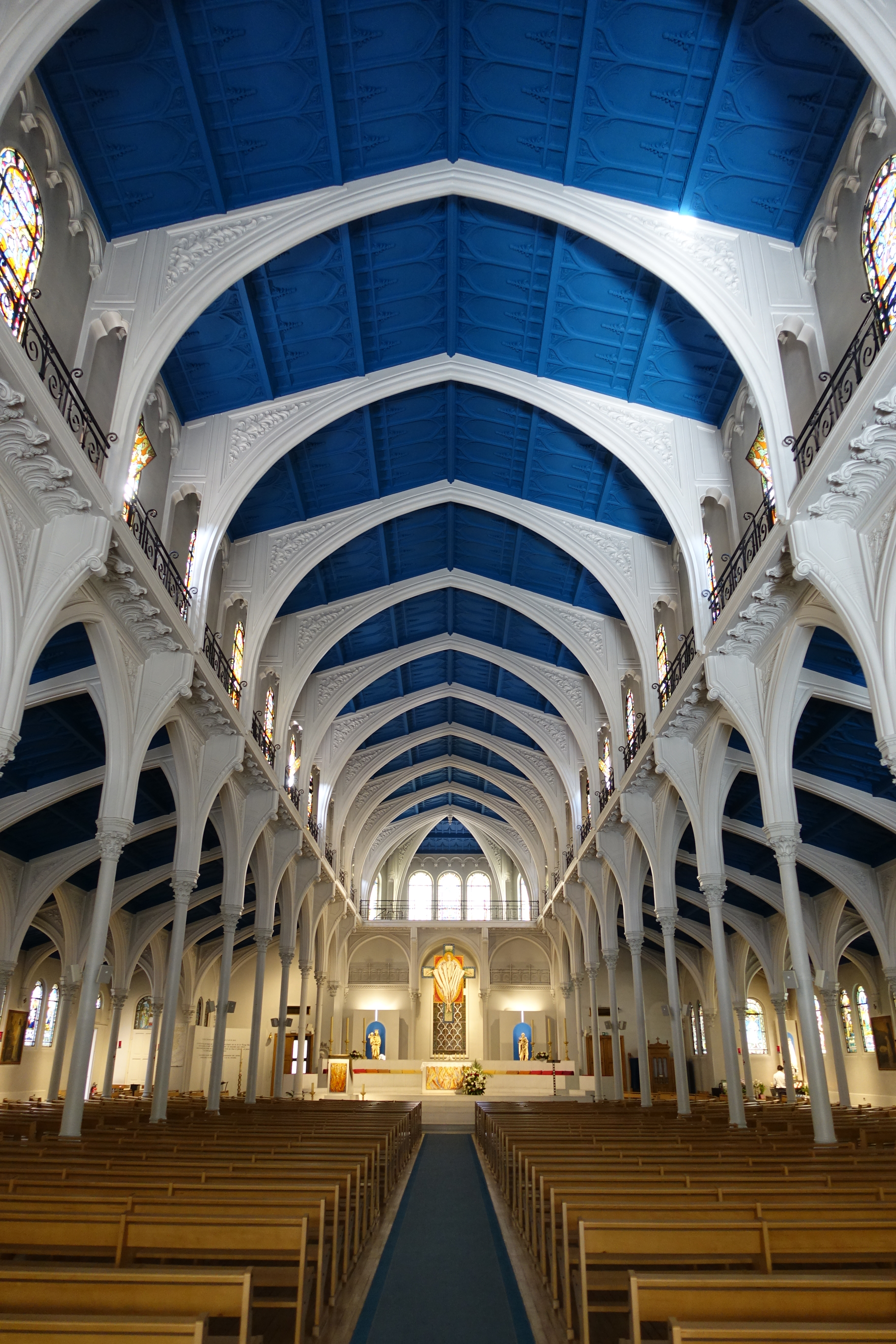
The Nave

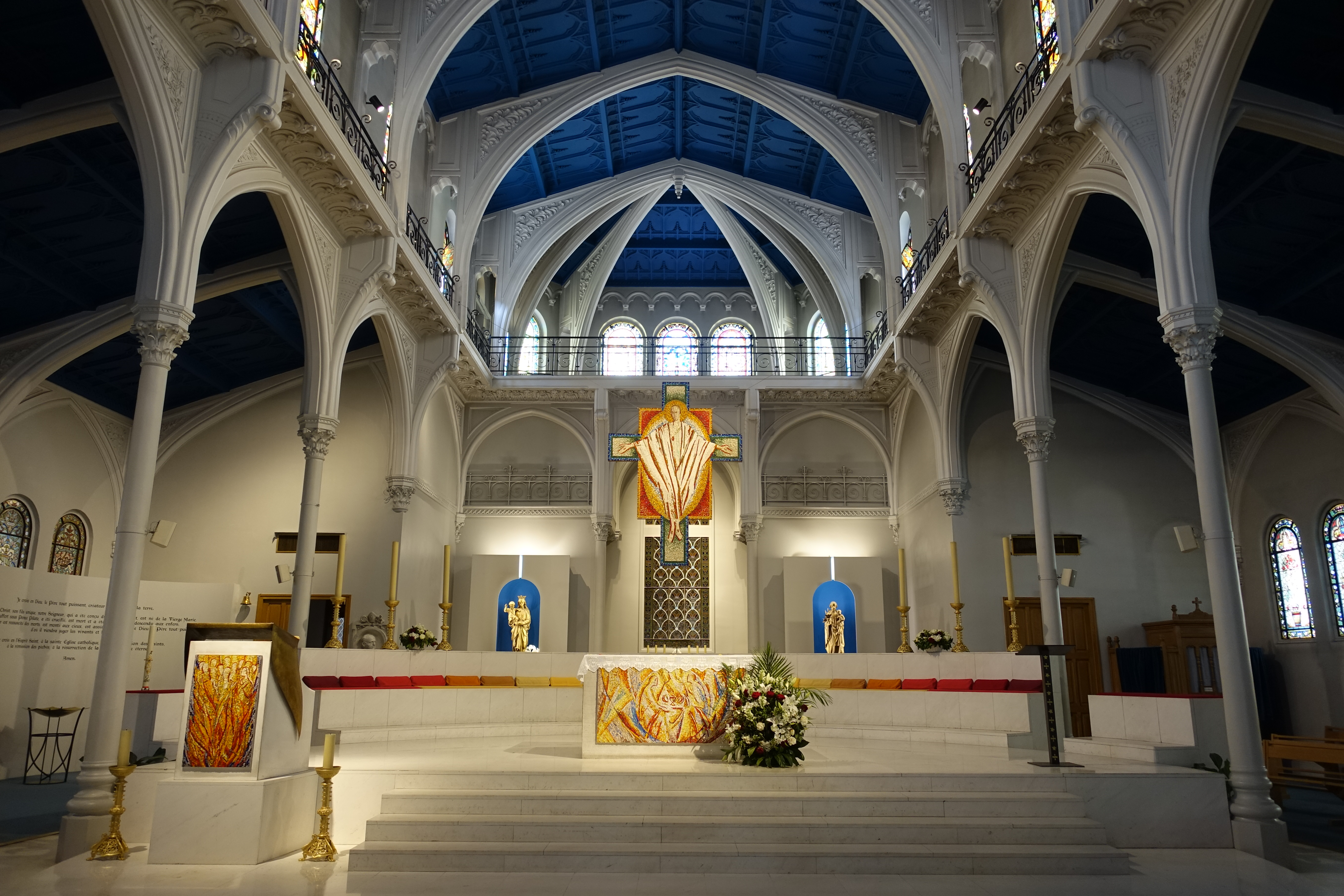
The Choir

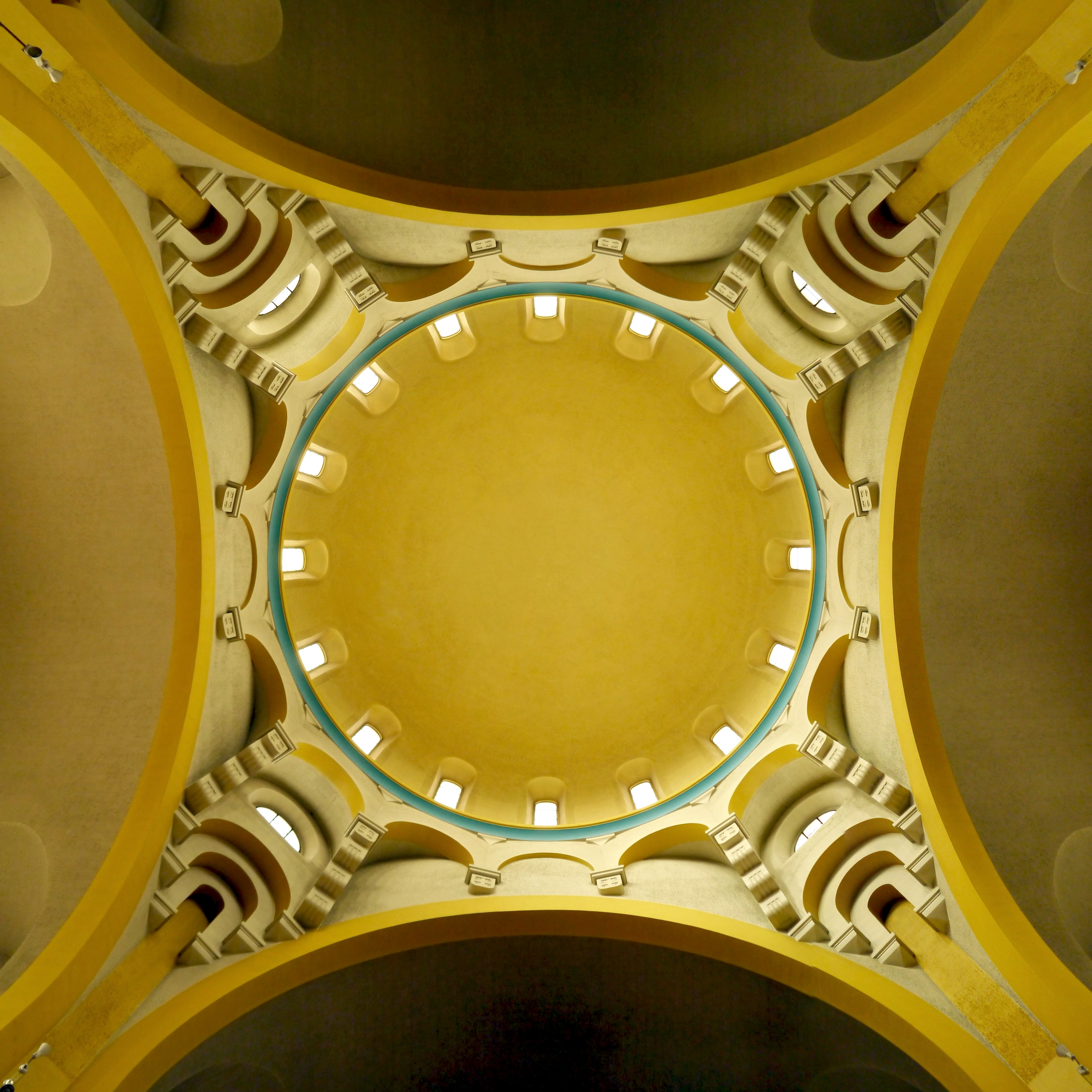
Interior of the dome

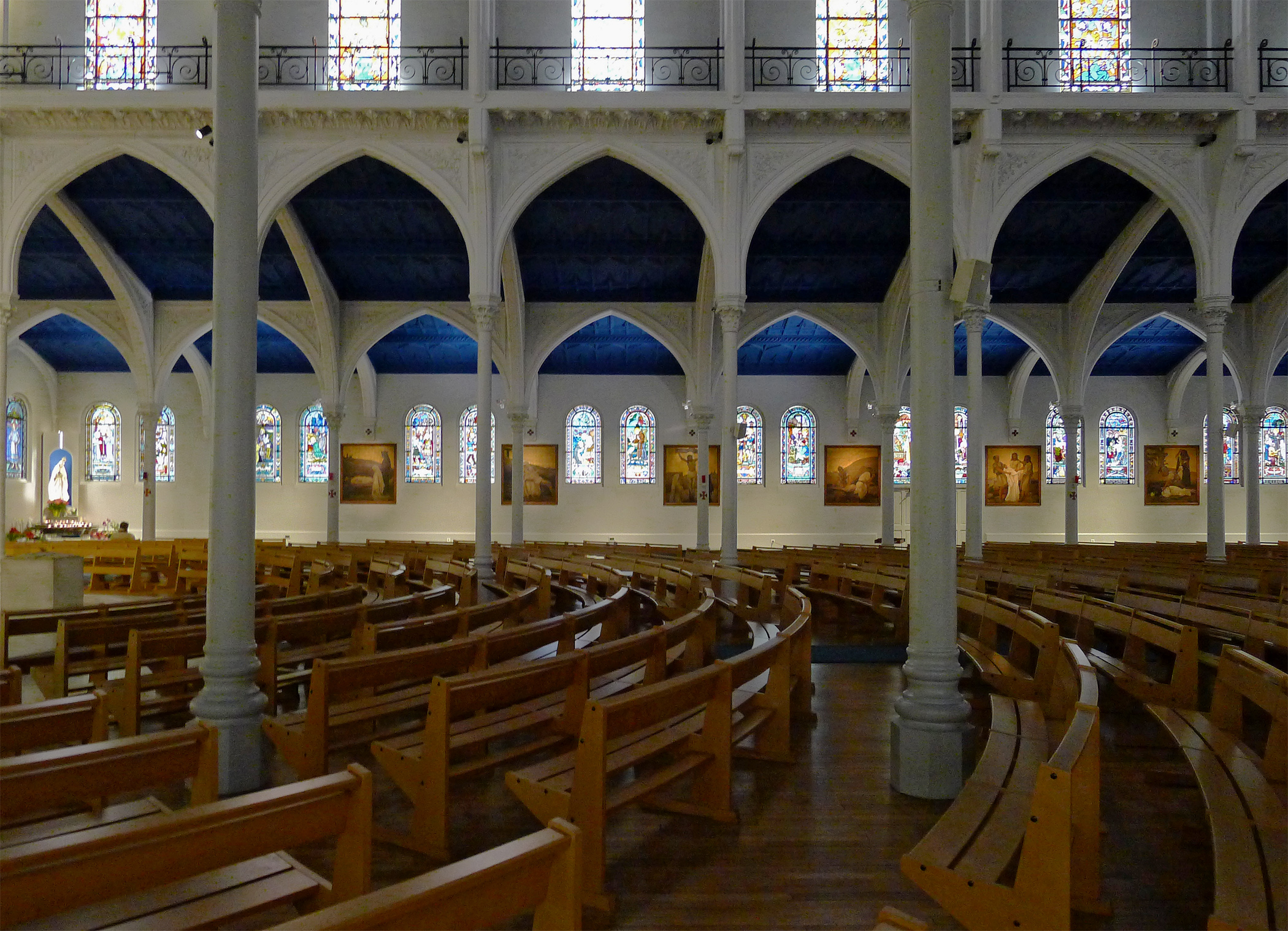
side aisle

=== Art and decoration ===
The vault of the apse and choir is decorated with a large fresco entitled "The Resurrection" made by Maurice Rocher (1918-1995) and Paul Vigroux (1921-1985). Stained glass windows line both sides of the nave on both levels.

The Chapel of Sainte-Therese-de-Liseaux is in the Art Deco style, and features fresco murals by Alfred Sauvage (1892-1974) illustrating seven sacraments.

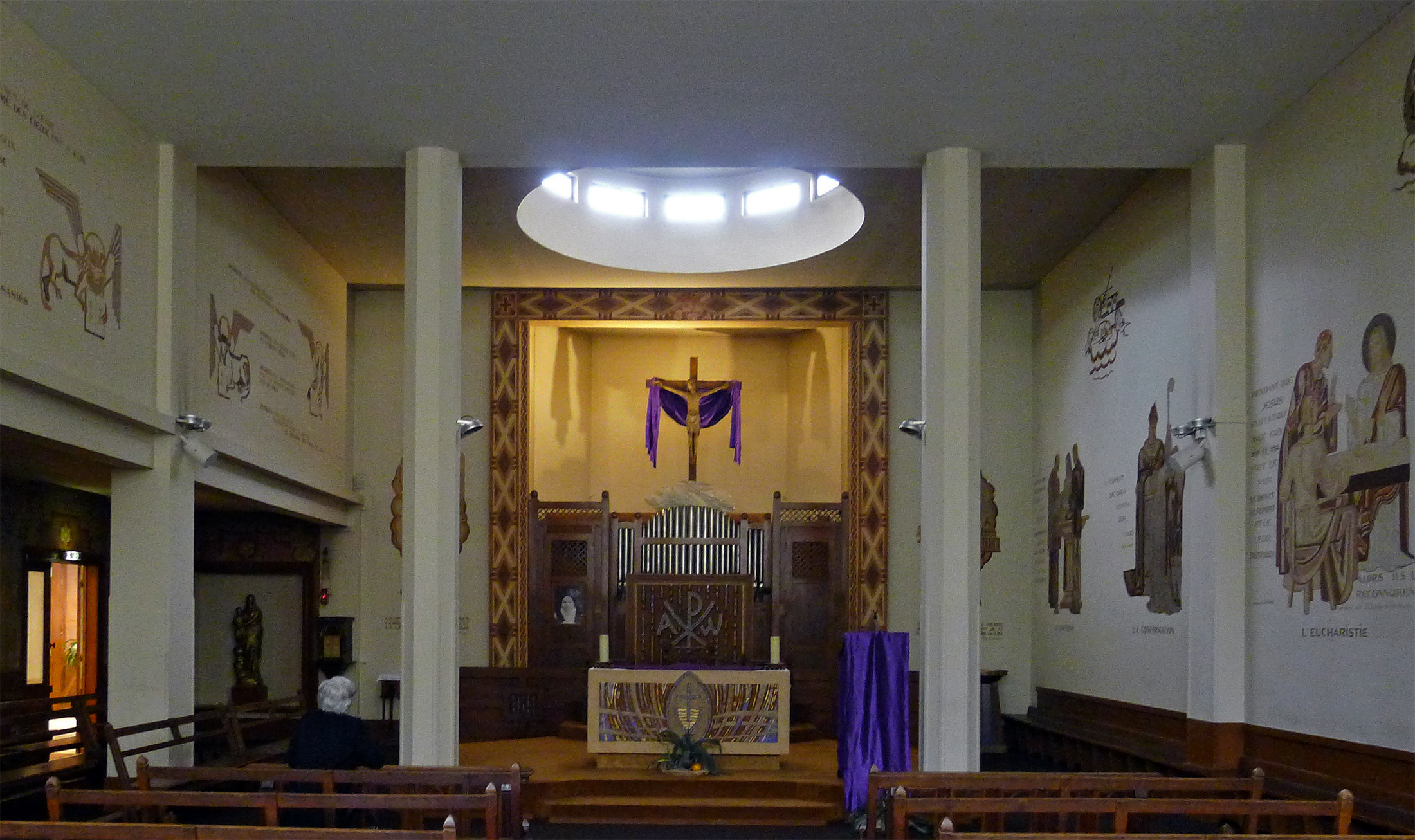
Chapel of Sainte Therese-de-Liseaux, with mural of the seven sacraments

=== Stained glass ===
The stained glass dates to the first half of the 20th century, and is especially colourful and abundant, with more than fifty windows, linking two levels on both sides of the nave. Most were was made by Louis Barillet and Félix Gaudin, working from illustrations by Raphael Freida.

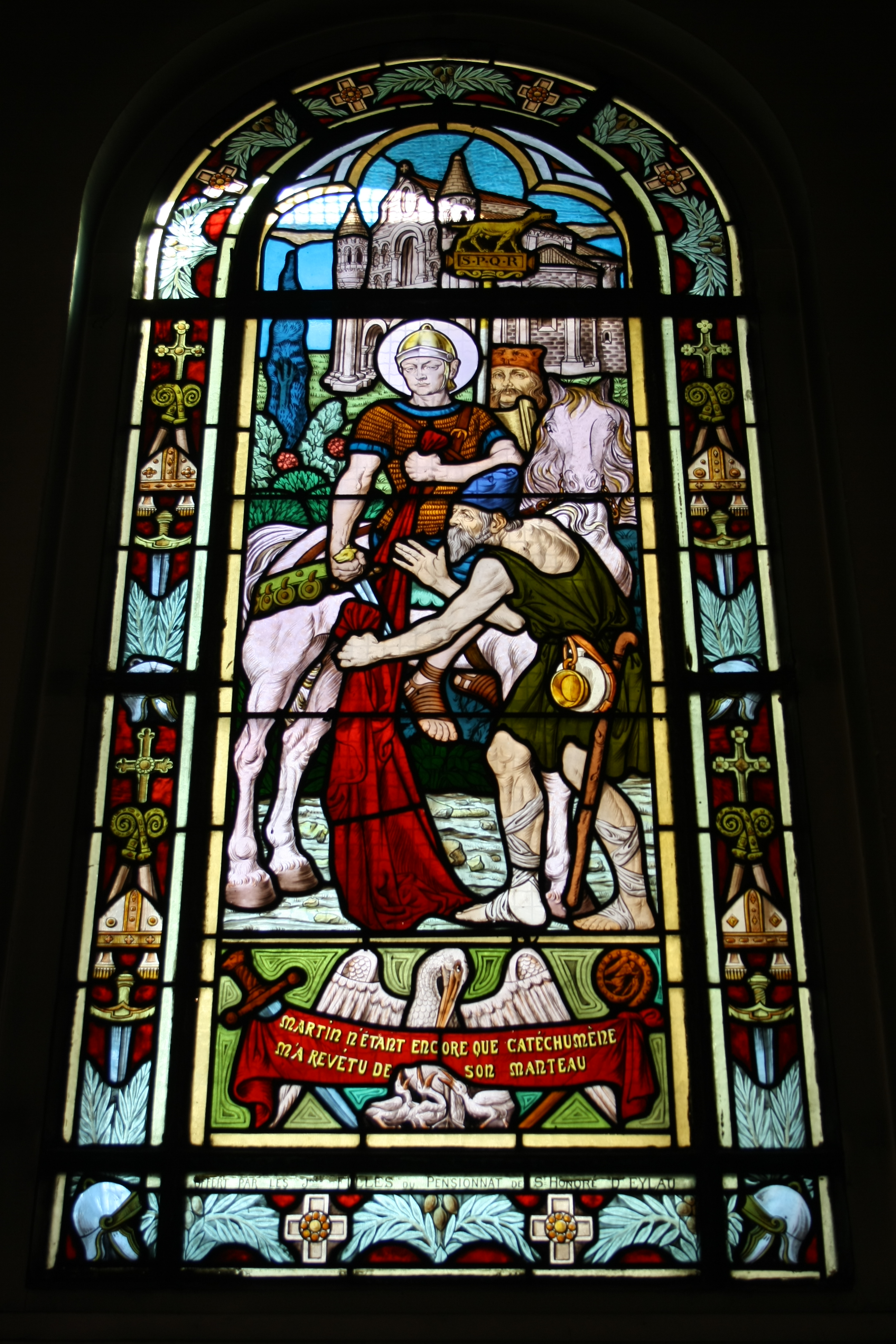
'Saint Martin gives up his cloak"

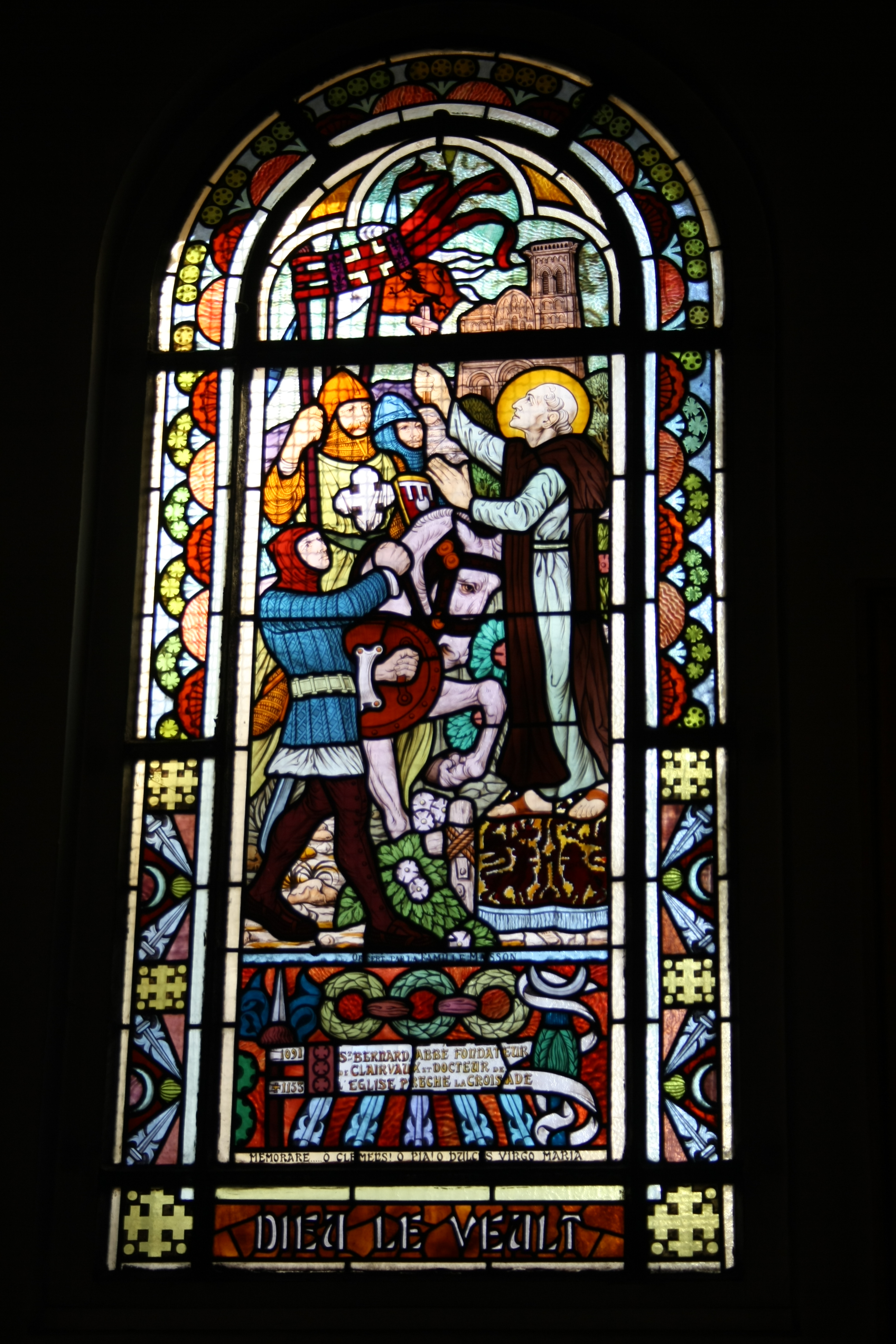
"Saint Bernard of Clairvaux"

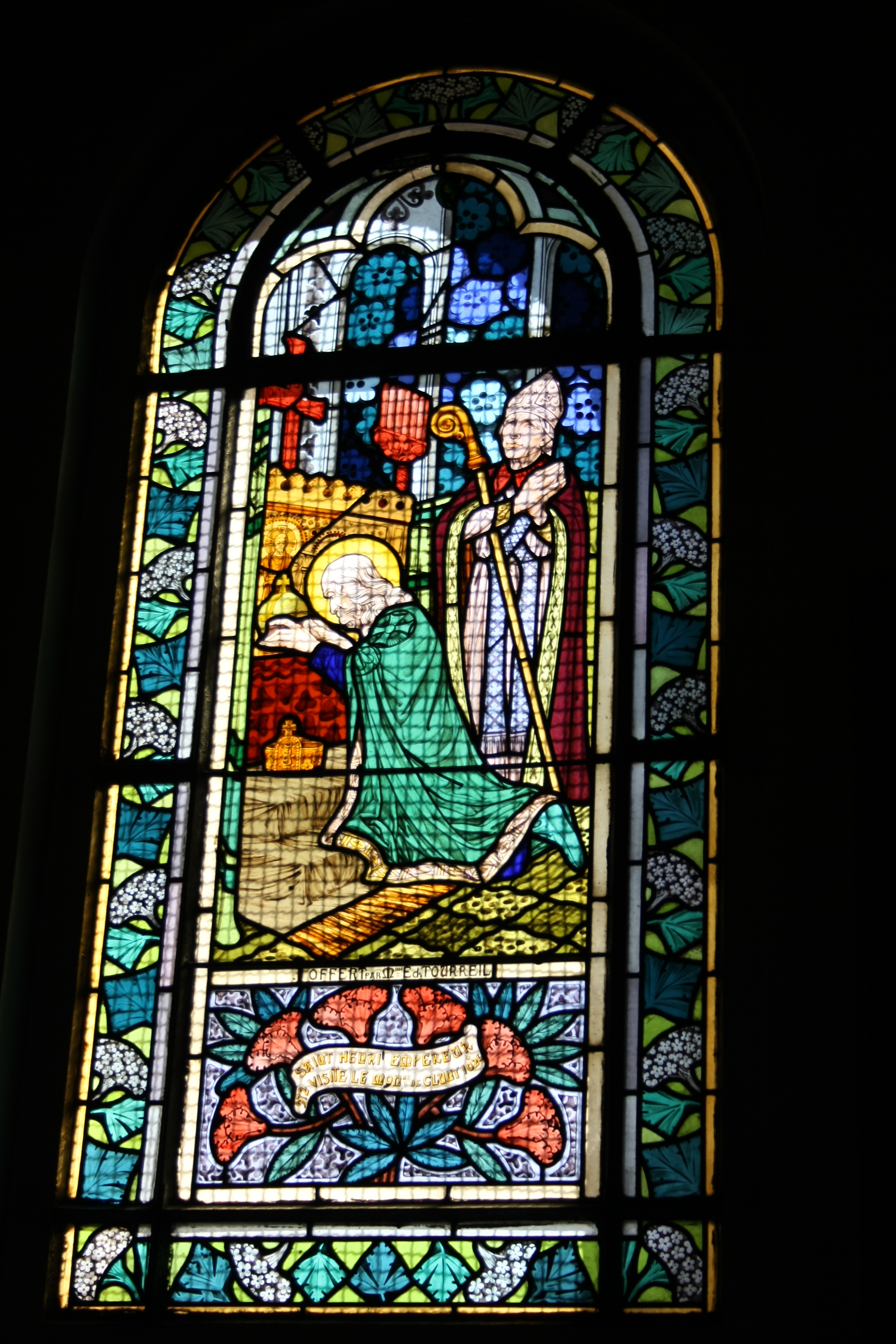
Portrayal of Henry II

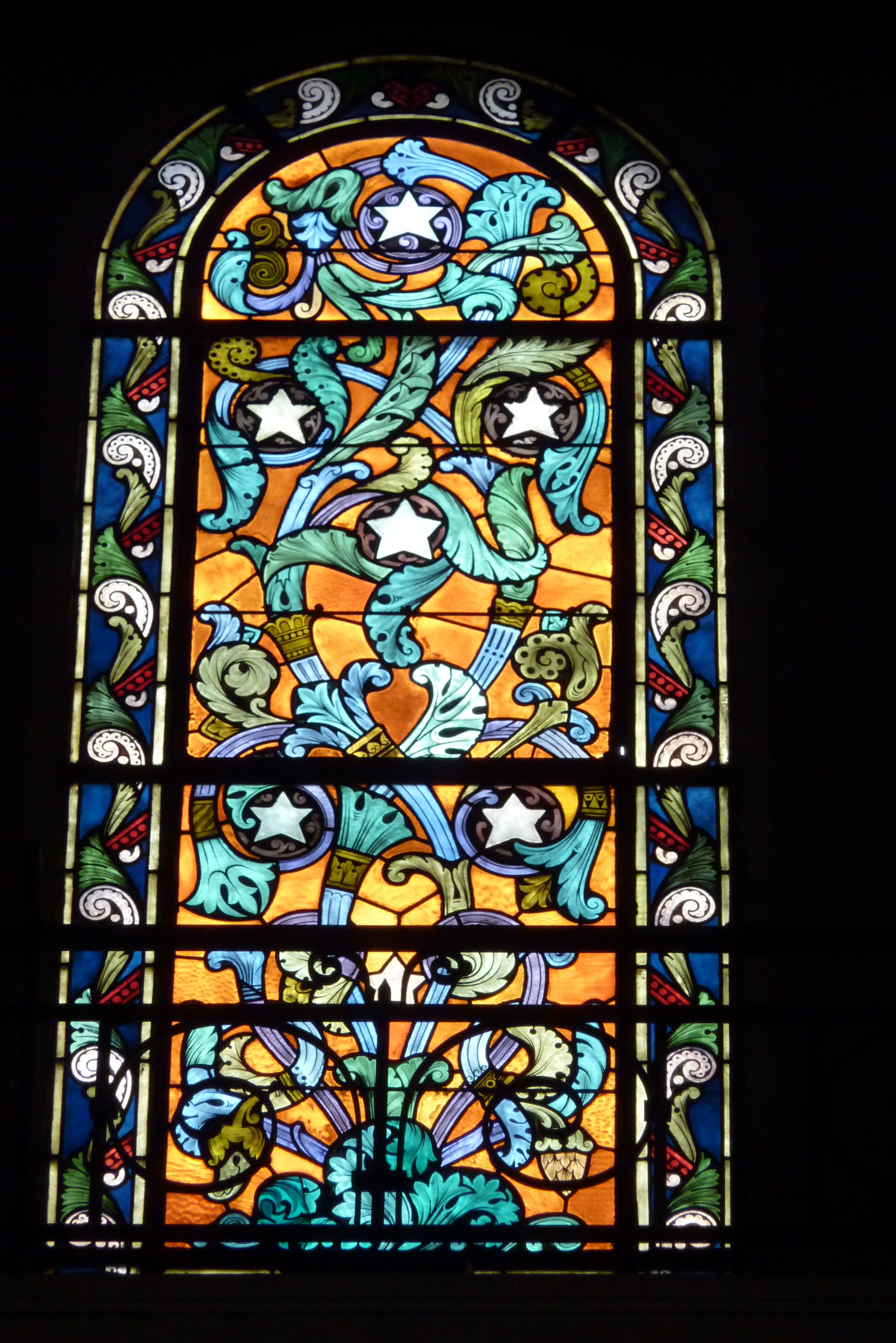
A decorative window

=== Organ ===
The organ of the church was installed in the tribune in 1903. It was rebuilt in 1934 and 2001.

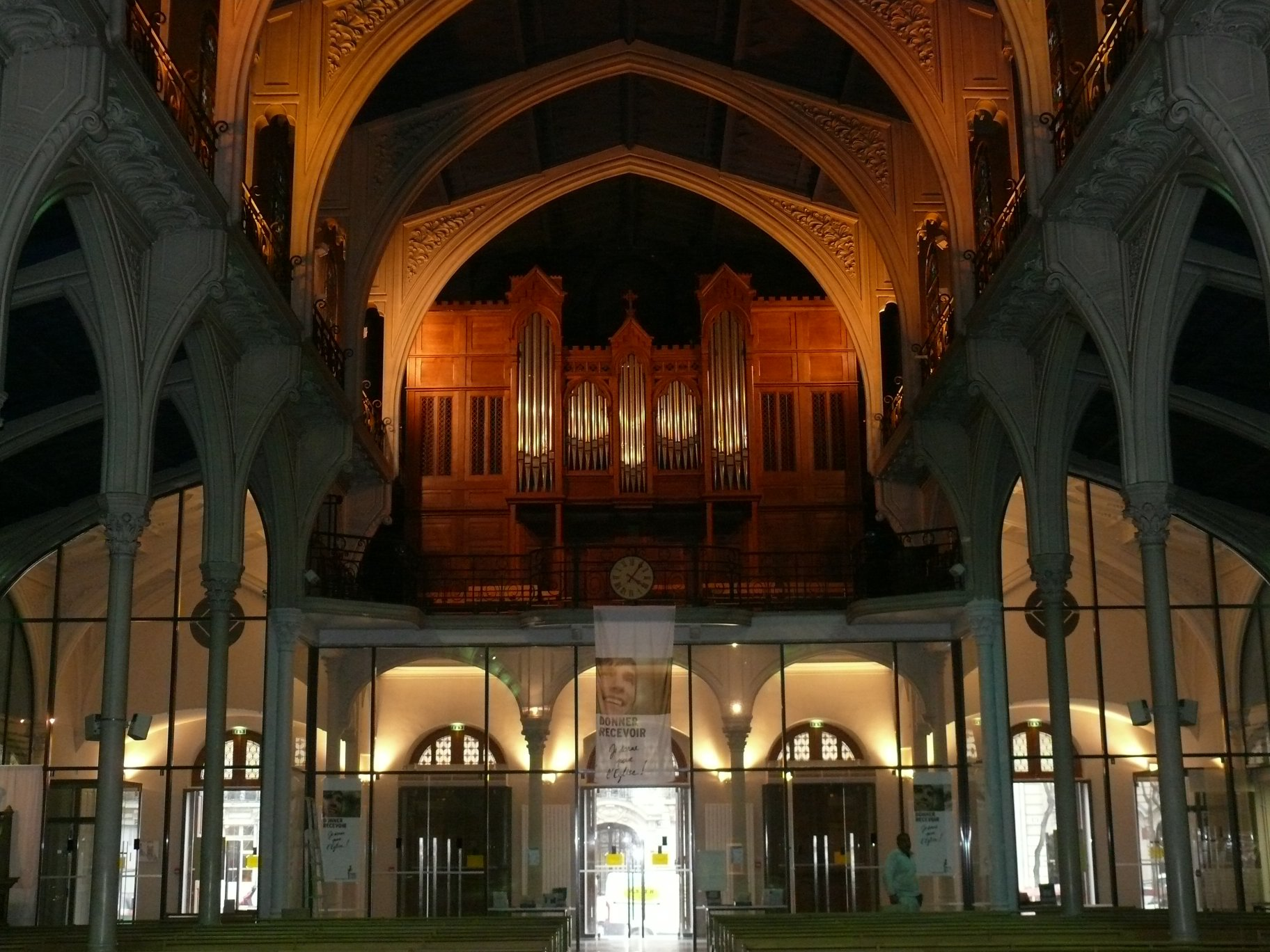
The grand organ in the tribune, illuminated

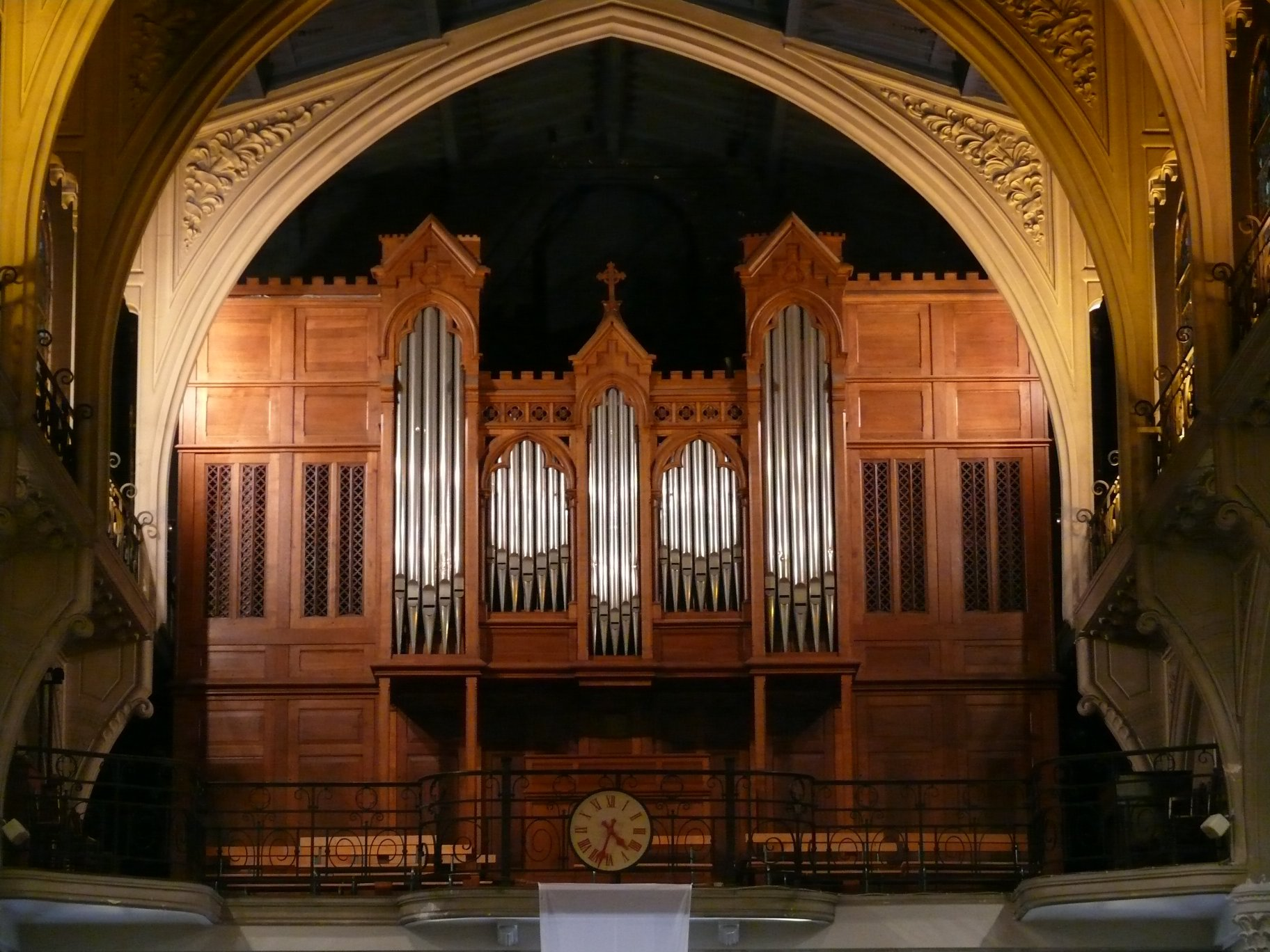
Organ -closer view

== Old church ==
The old church is located on Place Victor Hugo at the intersection of Avenue Victor Hugo and rue Mesnil in the 16th arrondissement of Paris (48.8692°N 2.2848°E). It was originally built in 1852 as a parish church. Since 1974 it is the chapel of the Monastic Family of Bethlehem.

=== History ===
On 2 September 1867 the funeral service of the poet Charles Baudelaire was held in the old church. On May 13, 1871, during the Paris Commune, the church was closed and turned into a barracks for the Commune National Guard. In 1974, the church became the chapel of the Monastic Family of Bethlehem. The brothers, wearing white robes, devote their time to meditation and prayer.

=== Statue ===
A statue of Joan of Arc stands alongside the church. It is a replica of the marble statue of Joan that was made in marble by Marie d'Orleans that is now at the Chateau of Versailles.

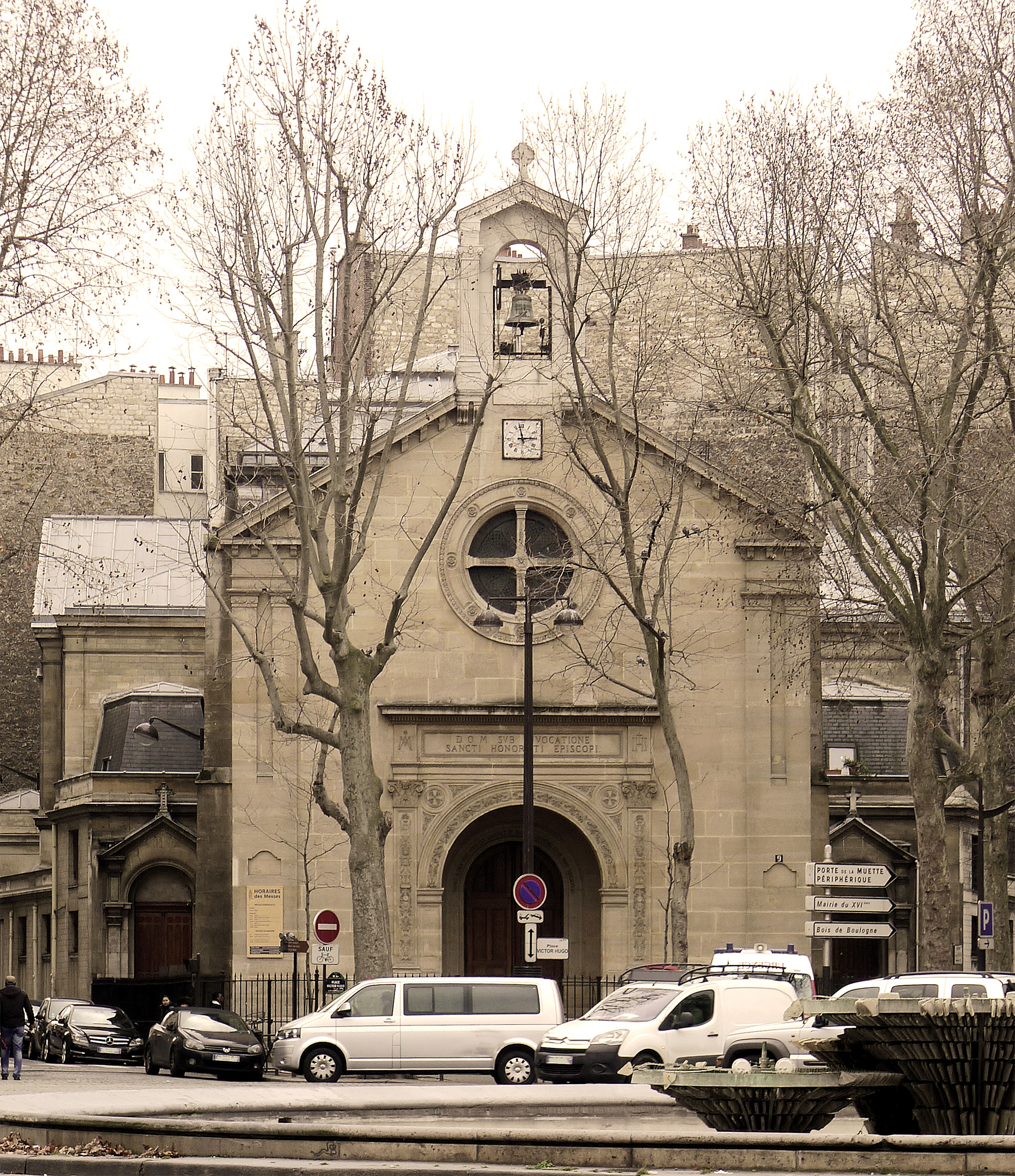
The old church (1852). It is devoted to prayer and meditation.

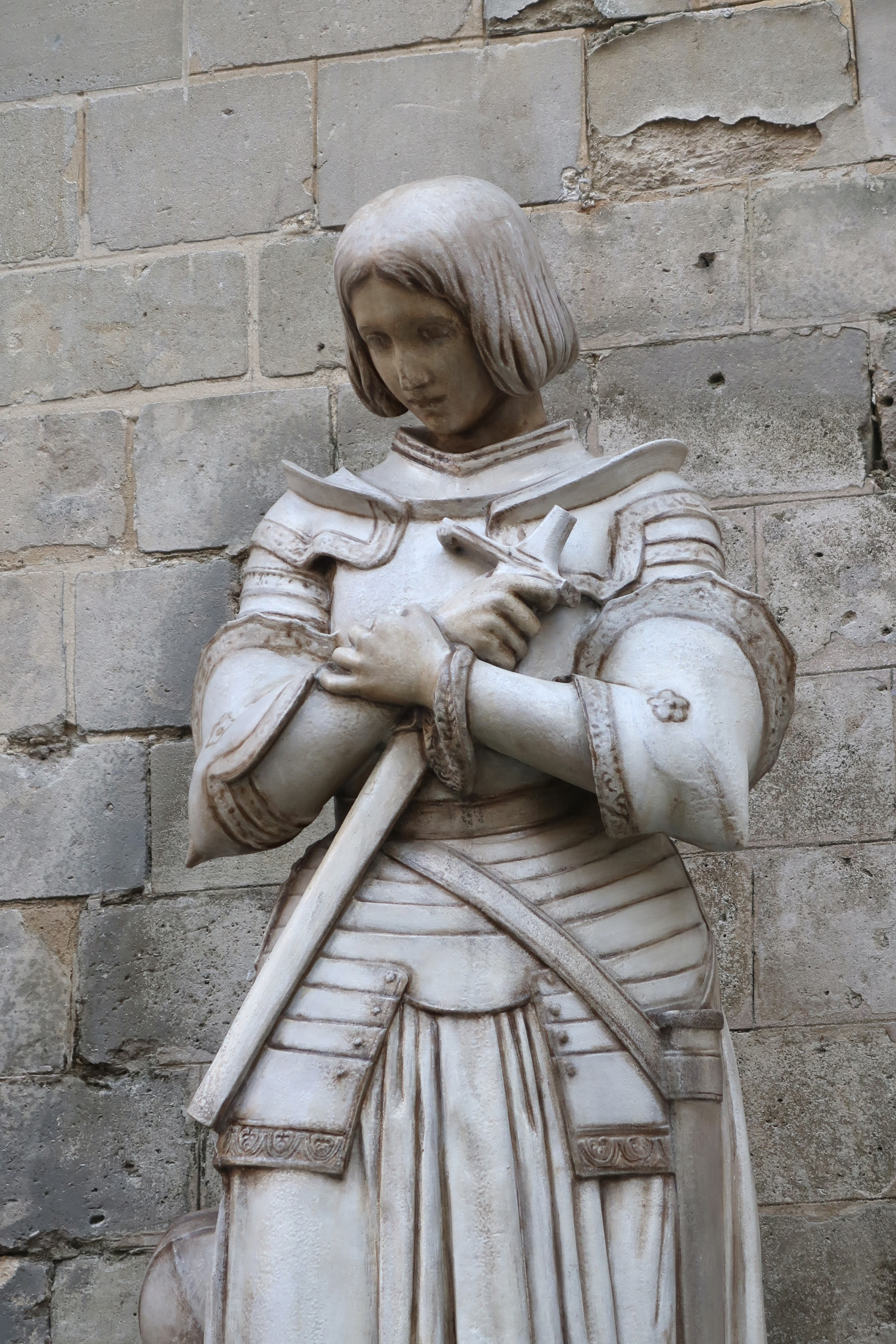
Statue of Joan of Arc outside the church

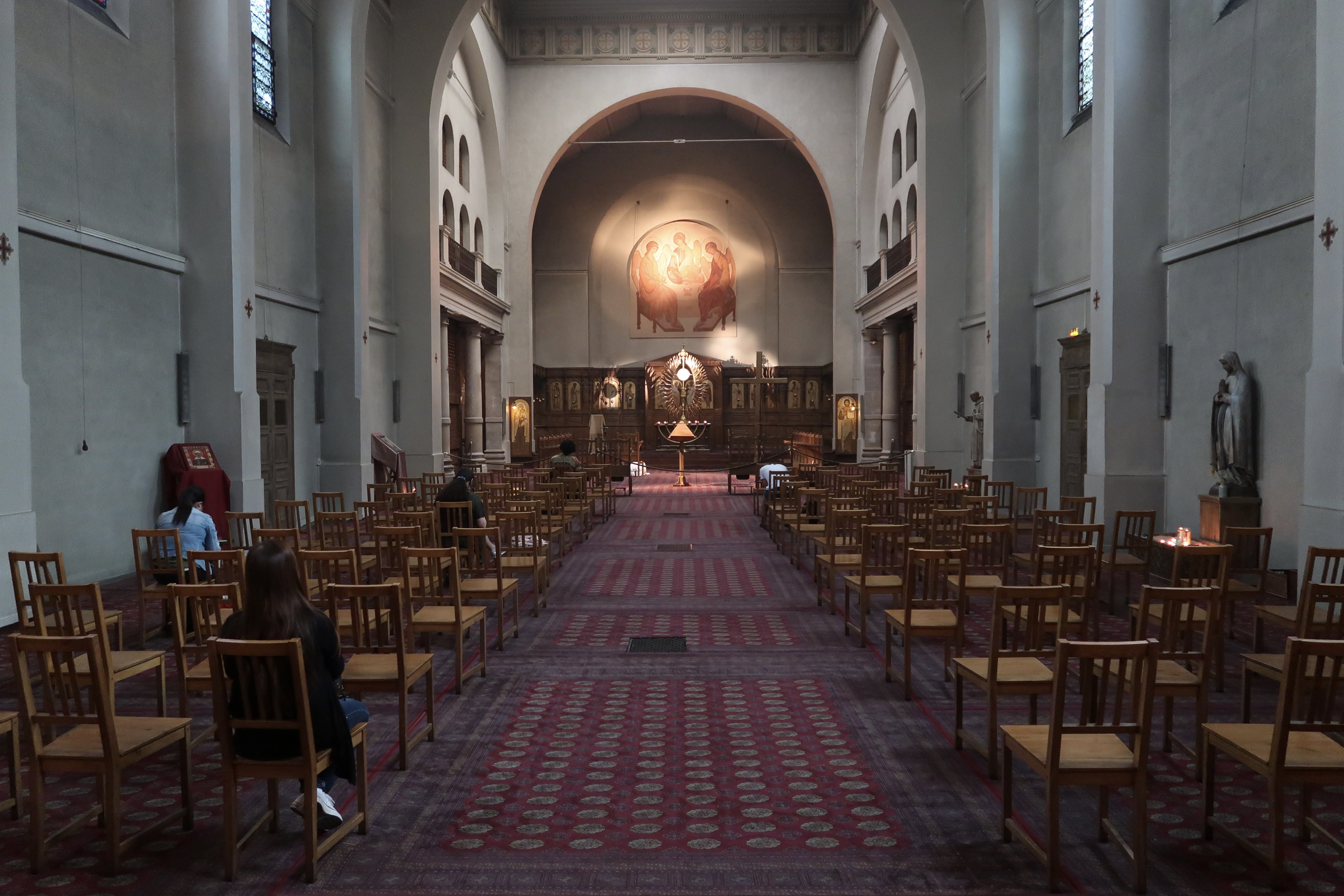
Interior of the old church

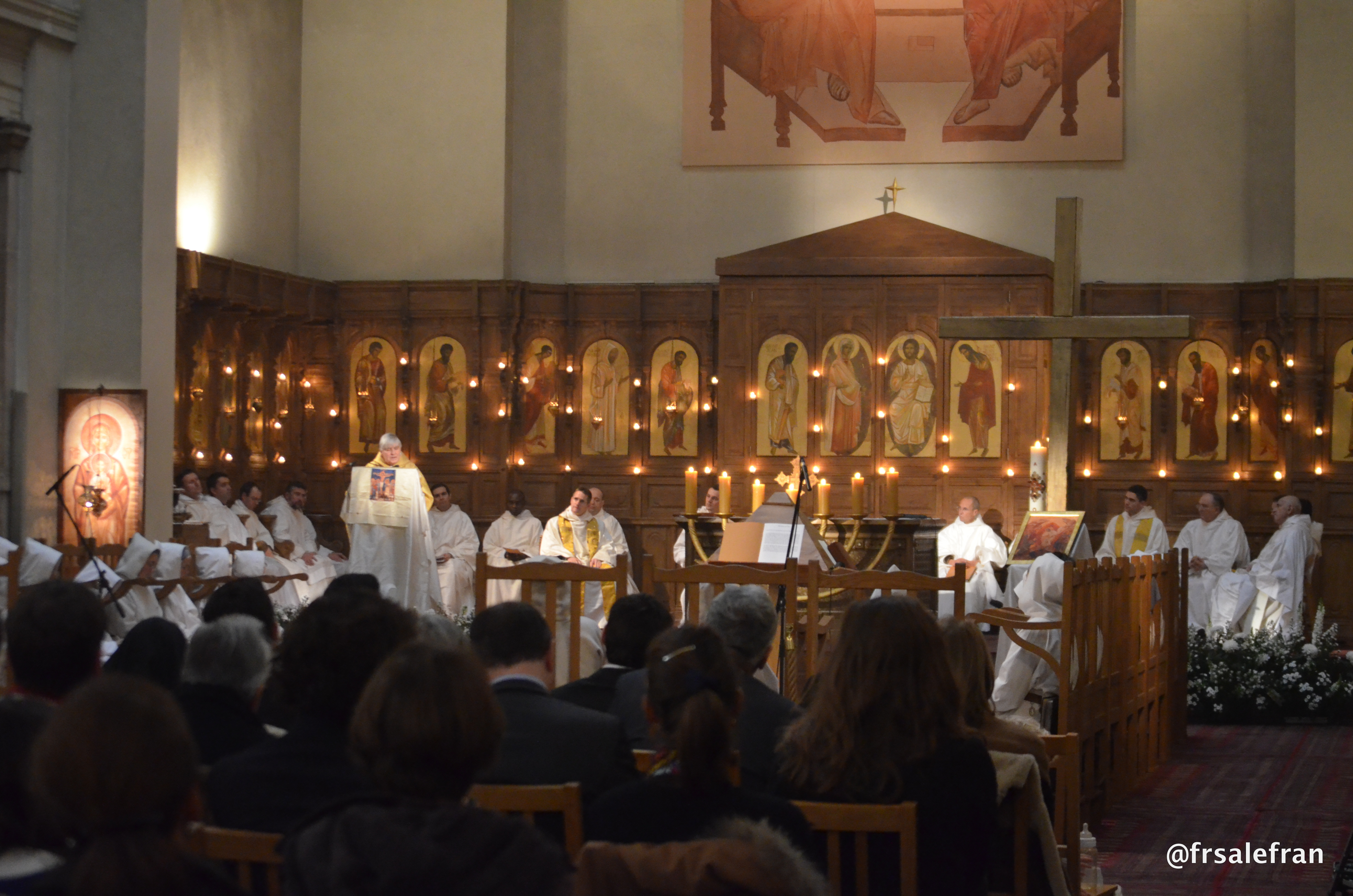
A service by monks in the old church
