= Our Lady Queen of Palestine =

Our Lady Queen of Palestine, also known as Mary Queen of Palestine, is a title of the Blessed Virgin Mary venerated in the Catholic Church, particularly by the Latin Patriarchate of Jerusalem and the Christian communities of Palestine and Israel. The devotion originated in 1920 under Luigi Barlassina, then Latin Patriarch of Jerusalem, who placed Palestine under Mary's patronage. The principal shrine associated with the title is located at Deir Rafat, west of Jerusalem.

== History ==
=== Origin of the devotion ===
On 15 July 1920, Luigi Barlassina made his solemn entry into the Church of the Holy Sepulchre following his appointment as Latin Patriarch of Jerusalem. He placed Palestine under the patronage of the Virgin Mary, invoking her under the title of "Queen of Palestine". Barlassina composed a prayer dedicated to Mary under this title and encouraged its recitation in the parishes and religious communities of the Holy Land.

=== Shrine at Deir Rafat ===
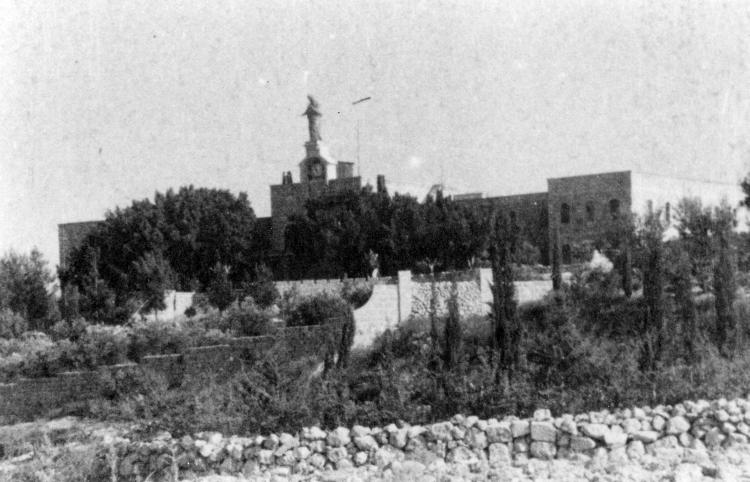
The Marian shrine at Deir Rafat

To establish a centre for the devotion, Barlassina commissioned a Marian shrine at Deir Rafat, between Jerusalem and the Mediterranean coast. Designed by the Benedictine monk Maurizio Gisler, construction began in 1925. The building was completed in 1927 and inaugurated in 1928.

The shrine's decoration includes the greeting of the Archangel Gabriel to Mary, "Hail Mary", inscribed in 280 languages. An image of the Virgin Mary depicts her blessing the Holy Land, accompanied by angels bearing a sceptre and crown. The shrine became a pilgrimage destination for Catholic communities throughout the region.

=== Liturgical recognition ===
The celebration of Mary under the title of Queen of Palestine was observed on the last Sunday of October. The solemnity received approval from Pope Pius XI in 1933, according to the Latin Patriarchate's historical account.

In 1994, Pope John Paul II proclaimed the Virgin Mary under the title Regina Palestinae patroness of the Equestrian Order of the Holy Sepulchre of Jerusalem, an order that had contributed to the construction of the shrine.

== Feast day ==
The feast of the Blessed Virgin Mary, Queen of Palestine, is celebrated on 25 October. The principal celebration takes place at the shrine of Deir Rafat and includes a Mass and a procession with an image of the Virgin Mary. The feast draws clergy, pilgrims and members of Catholic communities from across the Holy Land.
