= Filippo Camassei =

Italian cardinal

His Eminence Filippo Camassei
- Latin Patriarch Emeritus of Jerusalem
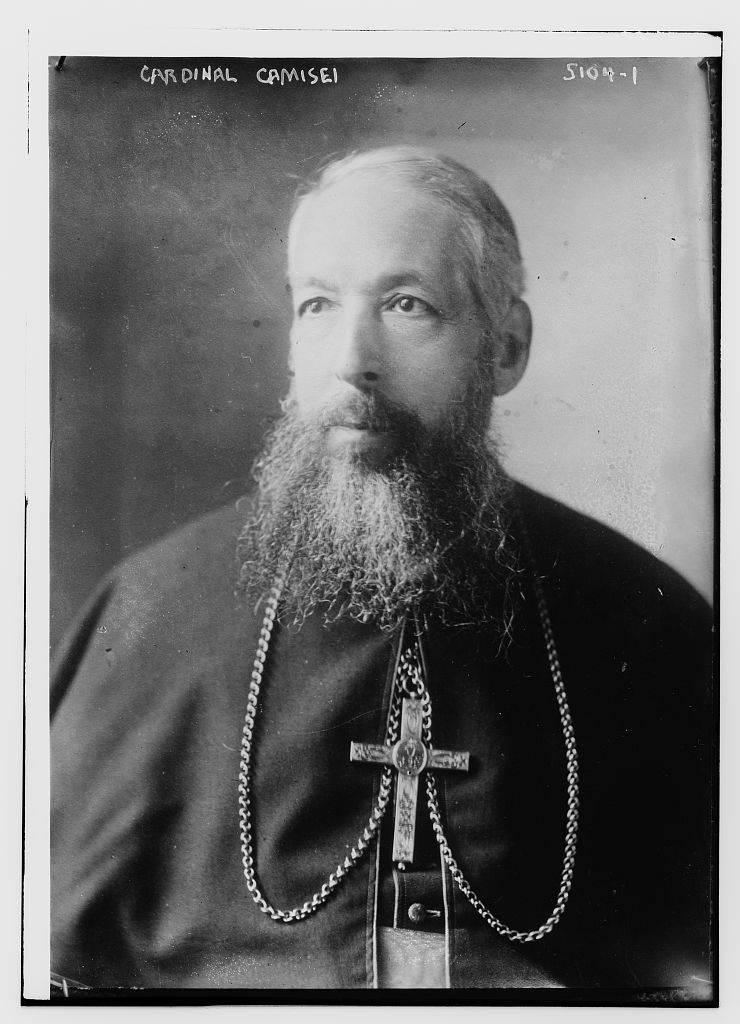
- Camassei circa 1915.
- Church: Roman Catholic Church
- See: Jerusalem
- Appointed: 6 December 1906
- Term ended: 18 January 1921
- Predecessor: Luigi Piavi
- Successor: Luigi Barlassina
- Other post: Cardinal-Priest of Santa Maria in Ara Coeli (1919-21)
- Previous post: Archbishop of Naxos (1904-06)

Orders
- Ordination: 12 April 1872
- Consecration: 10 April 1904 by Girolamo Maria Gotti
- Created cardinal: 15 December 1919 by Pope Benedict XV
- Rank: Cardinal-Priest

Personal details
- Born: Filippo Camassei; 14 September 1848 Rome, Papal States
- Died: 18 January 1921 (aged 72) Rome, Kingdom of Italy
- Buried: Campo Verano
- Education: Pontifical Roman Seminary

Styles of Filippo Camassei
- Reference style: His Eminence
- Spoken style: Your Eminence
- Informal style: Cardinal
- See: Jerusalem

Filippo Camassei (14 September 1848 – 18 January 1921) was an Italian cardinal of the Roman Catholic Church who served as Latin Patriarch of Jerusalem from 1906 to 1919. He was elevated to the rank of cardinal in 1919.

== Biography ==
Filippo Camassei was born in Rome, and studied at the Pontifical Roman Seminary, from where he obtained his doctorates in theology and in canon and civil law. He was ordained to the priesthood on 12 April 1872, and then did pastoral work in Rome. In 1876, Camassei became private secretary to Cardinal Raffaele Monaco La Valletta, the Vicar-General of Rome. He was later made Rector of the Pontifical Pius Seminary in 1874, and of the Pontifical Urbanian Athenaeum De Propaganda Fide on 10 December 1889. In June 1895, he traveled to Maynooth in County Kildare, Ireland to represent Pope Leo XIII at the centennial celebrations of St Patrick's Pontifical University.

He was raised to the rank of Domestic Prelate of His Holiness on 13 April 1897. On 18 March 1904, Camassei was appointed Archbishop of Naxos by Pope Pius X. He received his episcopal consecration on the following 10 April from Cardinal Girolamo Maria Gotti, with Archbishops Pietro Gasparri and Edmund Stonor serving as co-consecrators, in the chapel of the Pontifical Urbanian Athenaeum De Propaganda Fide. Camassei was promoted to Latin Patriarch of Jerusalem on 6 December 1906. In making his solemn entry into Jerusalem on 19 March 1907, he declined to wear the ornately decorated ceremonial clothes. During World War I, he was exiled to Nazareth by the Turks on 19 November 1917.

In Nazareth, he was hosted by the Franciscan friars and continued to supervise the parishes in northern Palestine. Camassei appointed Monsignor François Vilinger as his vicar in order to supervise the rest of the parishes in Palestine and Jordan. The Patriarch returned to Jerusalem after the Anglo-French victory on 3 November 1918. Shortly afterwards, in May 1919, he went to Rome for a period of rest and to visit the Vatican. Pope Benedict XV there created him cardinal priest of Santa Maria in Aracoeli in the consistory of 15 December.

Camassei died in Rome, one year later at age 73. He is buried in the sepulchre of the Congregation for the Propagation of the Faith in the Campo Verano cemetery.

Catholic Church titles
Preceded by Giuseppe Zaffino	Archbishop of Naxos; 1904–1906	Succeeded by Leonard Brindisi
Preceded by Luigi Piavi, OFM	Latin Patriarch of Jerusalem; 1906–1919	Succeeded by Luigi Barlassina
