= Lavra Netofa =

Melkite hermitage in Hararit, Israel

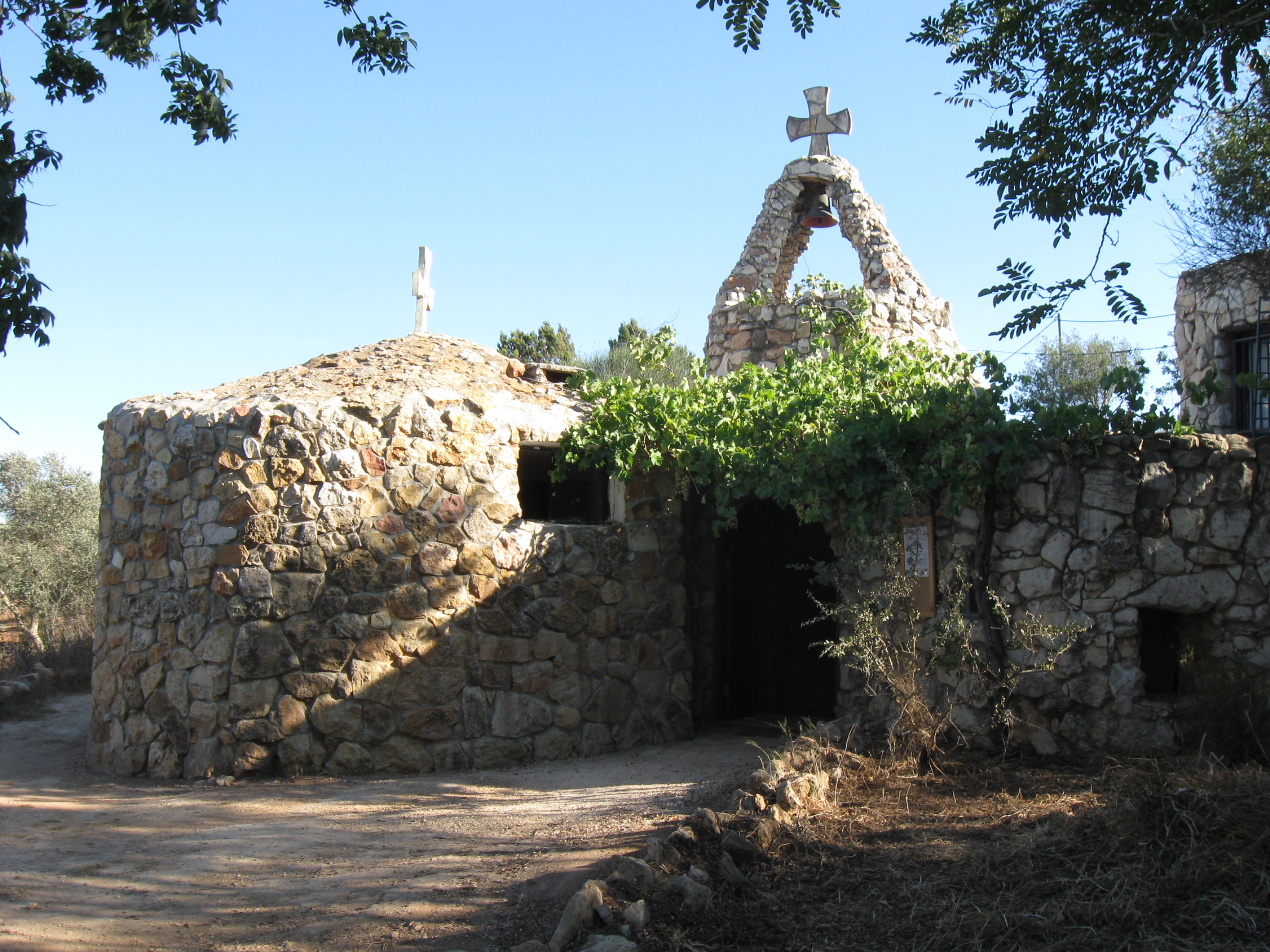
Lavra Netofa

Lavra Netofa (or Laura Netofa) is a Melkite hermitage on a mountain top above the village of Hararit in Galilee. An old-looking stone structure, built from local stones, most of it constructed underground, serves as a chapel. The hermitage was founded in 1967 by two monks, the Dutch Father Jacob Willebrands and the American Father Toma Farelly, who answered the call to live among the Palestinian Christian community, and to serve as a bridge between them and their Jewish neighbors. The hermitage on Mt. Netofa was meant as a retreat for Christian monks and worshippers. While preparing the land, they found a deep ancient water hole from the Byzantine era and decided to clear it and make it an underground chapel. They dug up other water holes for the purpose of collecting rain water for their use.

Later, additional structures were added – small huts as living quarters for the monks, a dining room, a library and a winery. When climbing down the spiral stairs deep into the cave chapel, the air becomes chilly and cool. During the day, beautiful rays of light penetrate the church as the sun makes its way through the entrance way upstairs and fill the air with a charming spiritual atmosphere. Down inside there is a small stone podium with three stone stairs leading up to it from which prayers are read daily and an iconostasis.

== Today ==
Today a few Monks and Sisters of Bethlehem live in Lavra Netofa. Most of them came from the Bet Jamal Monastery on the Judean Hills after the death of father Jacob Willebrands in 2005. In addition to them, it is not uncommon to find here volunteers from all over the world who participate in the daily maintenance works around the monastery and church and take part in the spiritual life here in return for a bed to sleep in and three meals a day. Life in Lavra Netofa is lived as close to nature as possible, with no running water or electricity in most living quarters. The spiritual and religious life is central to the monks’ daily life and consists of daily prayers and readings from the Bible. The people of the monastery welcome visitors of all religions and promote peaceful, harmonious existence and a sense of tolerance, modesty and peacefulness.
