= Monastic Family of Bethlehem =

Roman Catholic religious order

Monastic Family of Bethlehem, of the Assumption of the Virgin and of Saint Bruno
- Famille monastique de Bethléem, de l’Assomption de la Vierge et de Saint Bruno
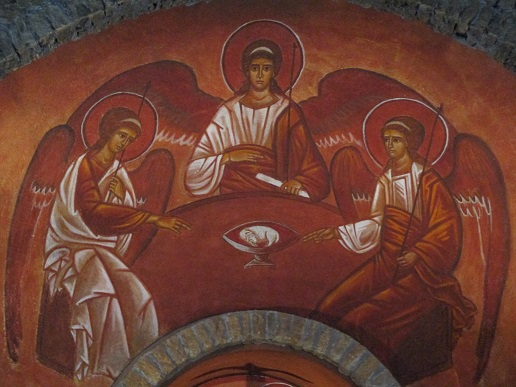
- Formation: 1951; 75 years ago
- Type: Institute of Consecrated Life of Pontifical Right (for Men and Women)
- Headquarters: Économe Générale Secrétaire des Monastères, 2055 Chemin de la Piquetière, F-38380 Saint-Laurent-du-Pont, France
- Members: 30 Monastic Brothers; 550 Monastic Sisters (2023)
- Prioress General: Sr. Isabelle Flye-Sainte-Marie
- Website: www.bethleem.org

The Monastic Family of Bethlehem in full: Monastic Family of Bethlehem, of the Assumption of the Virgin and of Saint Bruno is a religious institute in the Roman Catholic Church. The institute was originally founded in 1951 by Odile Dupont as a Dominican sisterhood: Les petites sœurs de Notre-Dame de la Nativité ("Little sisters of Our Lady of the Nativity"), "Bethlehem" in short. The sisterhood split from the Dominicans in 1971 and took a semi-eremitic model of life inspired by the Carthusians without however depending on their religious congregation.

== Charism ==
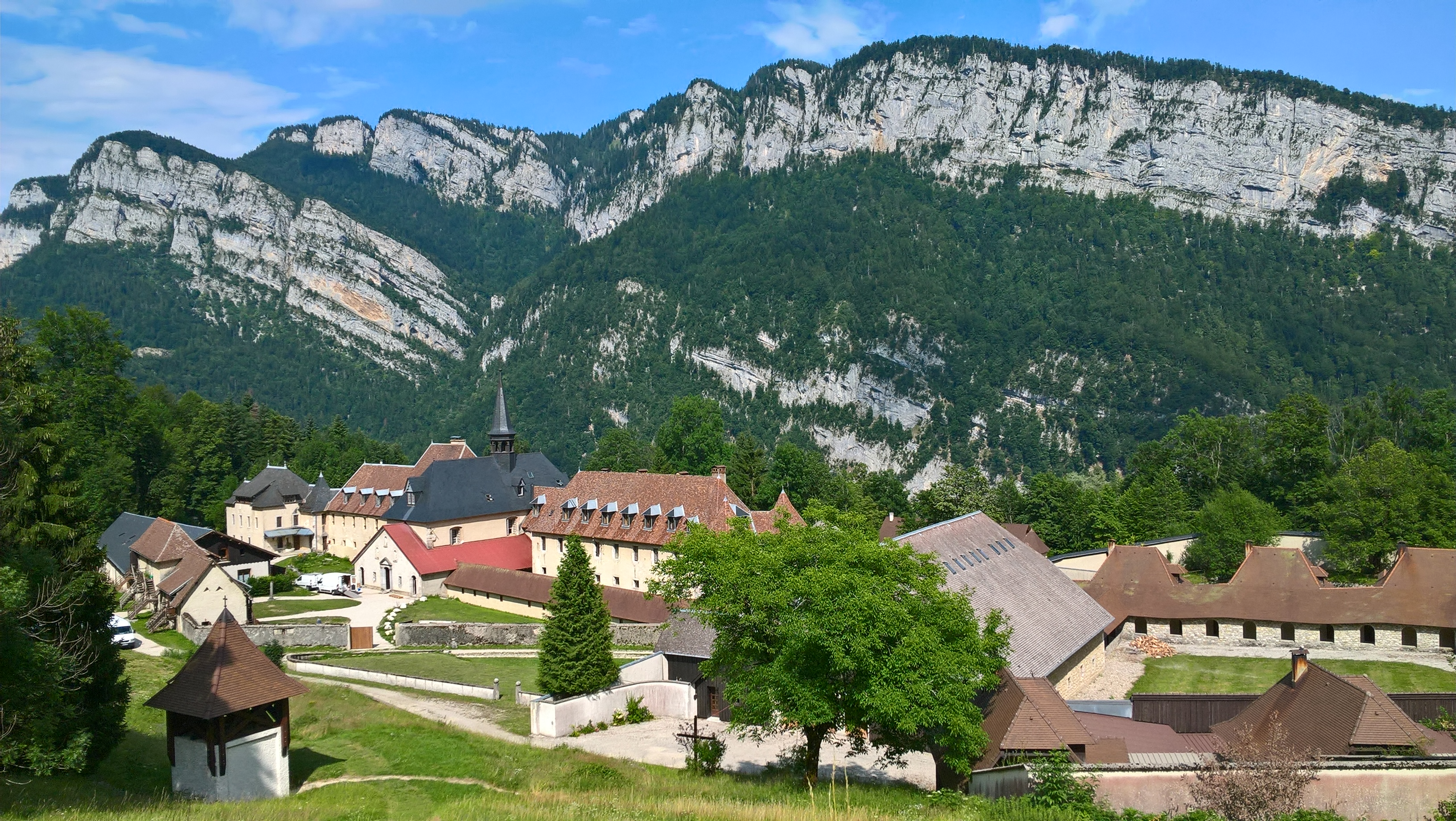
Motherhouse of the Monastic Family of Bethlehem situated near the Chartreuse Mountains in France

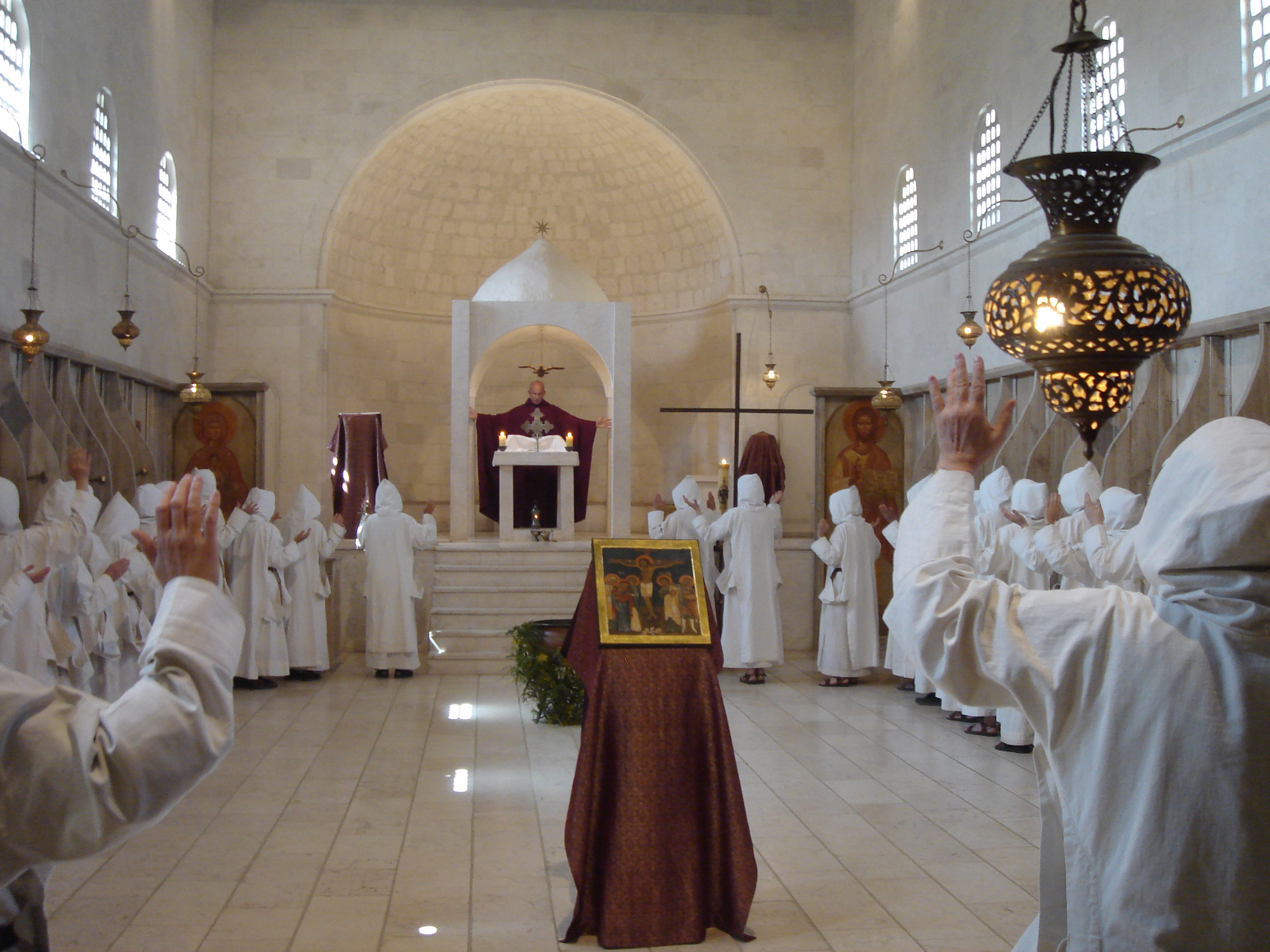
The daily Mass in a chapel of the Monastic Family of Bethlehem

The charism of the communities of the Monastic Family of Bethlehem, of the Assumption of the Virgin and of Saint Bruno consists in listening to the Gospel with the Blessed Virgin Mary in the heart of the Catholic Church, in love, in solitude, through liturgical life, study, work and poverty. In order to fulfill this vocation more perfectly, the Monasteries of Bethlehem receive Saint Bruno's fatherhood and his wisdom of life.

== Controversies ==
=== Numerous alerts to the Catholic hierarchy ===
On February 22, 1983, Le Monde published an investigation into the renewal of monastic life for women. According to Catherine Bakernote, interviewed in the article, "the fascination exerted on [the Bethlehem nuns], the obedience demanded, is of the order of a sect. We're on the verge of manipulative practices, which annihilate all individual reflection". On June 3, 1998, Magda (Sister Mirya in religion), a 27-year-old Polish woman from Krakow, ended her life by setting herself on fire at the Camporeggiano monastery near Gubbio, Italy. Her funeral was hastily celebrated on June 5, without an autopsy, as requested by Sister Marie, who presented her daughter's suicide to her mother as a ruptured aneurysm. The local bishop, Pietro Bottaccioli, was informed, but the matter was hushed up within the Monastic Family of Bethlehem.

In February 2001, La Vie magazine publishes an investigation entitled Des gourous dans les couvents ("Of gurus in convents"), which denounces "sectarian aberrations" in "five French religious communities", including the Bethlehem Monastic Family. The article refers to the case of a young woman who joined the community in 1987 at the age of 26, and was removed by her mother when her physical and mental state deteriorated. At the time of the article's publication, after two suicide attempts, she was "psychiatrically disabled" and living as a recluse with a relative. Letters discovered by the mother showed that her daughter had been manipulated by alleged messages from the Virgin, translated for her by the prioress general, Sister Isabelle. Contacted by the magazine, Sister Isabelle acknowledges "a great fault", which led her to ask forgiveness from the young woman's mother "and even from Rome, as the matter went all the way up to the Vatican".

In 2010, shocked by the attitude of the two prior generals, Sr. Isabelle and Br. Silouane, the former prior general of the male branch, Br. Patrick, delivered to the Dicastery for the Doctrine of the Faith on January 8 a forty-page document "reporting the serious disorders" he had witnessed in the community. The document included an account of the suicide at the Camporeggiano monastery. Br. Patrick received no response from the Holy See. The Monastic Family of Bethlehem, informed of his initiative, obtained his exclaustration in 2013 and sent him back in 2022.

At the end of October 2013, some forty victims of sectarian aberrations by new Catholic religious institutes, including former members of the Bethlehem Monastic Family, launched an appeal to the French bishops at their plenary assembly in Lourdes. In 2014 and 2015, the Aide aux Victimes des dérives de mouvements Religieux en Europe et à leurs Familles association ("Support for victims of religious aberrations in Europe and their families") and the website L'envers du décor ("Behind the scenes") published a long series of testimonies reporting sectarian aberrations in the Bethlehem Monastic Family, including, on October 28, 2014, that of a former superior, Fabio Barbero, first assistant to the prior general of the male branch, Bro. Silouane. Barbero describes a "feeling of superiority and compulsive defiance toward the Church" resulting in "an apparent level in conformity with the Church and a secret hidden level".

=== Canonical visitation in 2015 ===
At the end of May 2015, following several complaints from former sisters "which point to serious dysfunctions and which both the CEF (Bishops' Conference of France) and the Vatican [...] take 'very seriously'", canonical visitation was prompted by the Holy See, which appointed apostolic visitors Fr. Jean Quris, former Deputy Secretary General of the Bishops' Conference of France, and sister Geneviève Barrière, a Benedictine and former abbess of Jouarre between 2007 and 2014. The testimonies sent to Rome or published on the Internet denounce "a pressure to discern, an excessive rupture with the outside world, a culture of guilt, a centralization of power in the hands of the prioress general, the absence of real elections at local level and a unique way of thinking that does not allow any reflection", as well as the lack of distinction between internal and external fora. At the end of this canonical visitation in late 2016, the Congregation for Institutes of Consecrated Life recommended adaptations to put an end to what appeared to be "abuses of authority, even spiritual abuses".

=== Election of a new prioress general ===
Emmanuel Lorenchet de Montjamont) was appointed prioress general of the Monastic Family of Bethlehem by the Congregation of Religious of the Holy See in February 2017, following the resignation as prioress general of Sister Isabelle, herself succor of the community's founder, Sister Marie.

The prioress general is assisted by five sisters as her official advisers, and by two apostolic visitors: Jean Quris and Geneviève Barrière. The role of the apostolic visitors consists of remaining in close contact with the prioress general and her permanent advisers so as to ensure the implementation of the recommendations of the Roman Dicastery and the renewal of the Constitutions, with a view to preparing a future general chapter to vote on the new constitution's text and in the election of a prioress general.

== Presence in the world ==
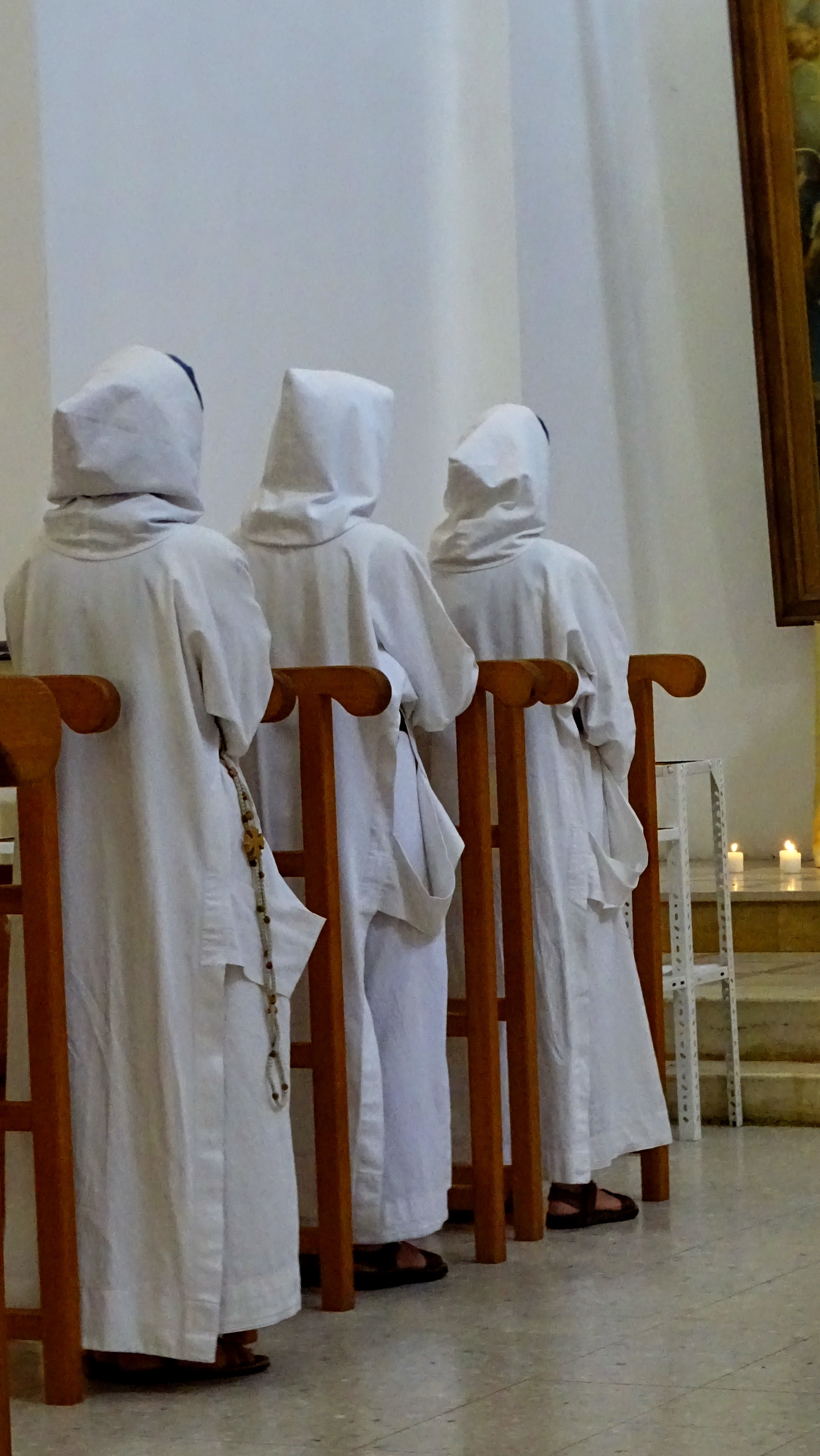
The life and religious habit of the Monastic Brothers and Monastic Sisters of Bethlehem is inspired by that of the Carthusians and its founder Bruno of Cologne

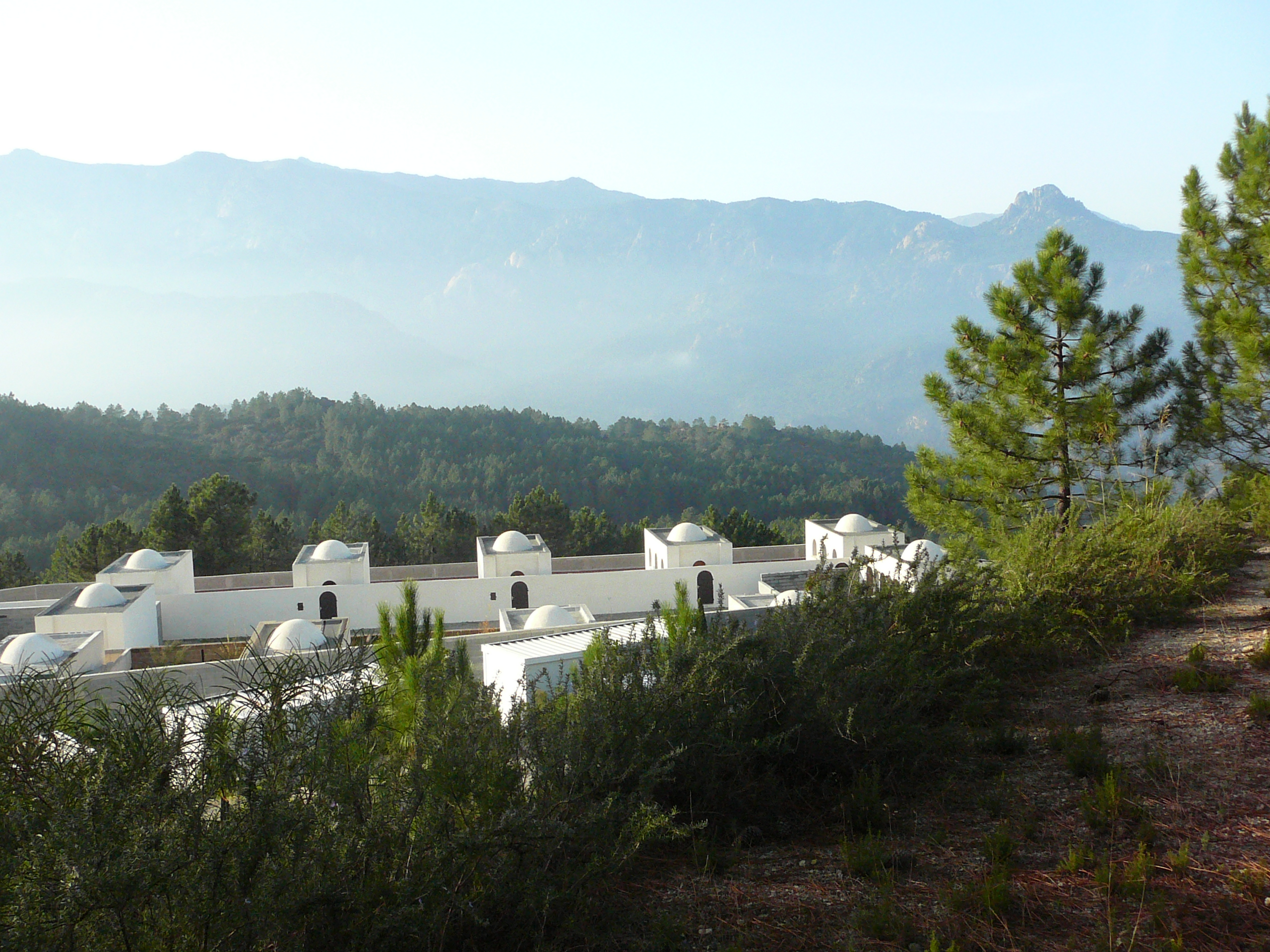
Modern and simple architecture is a feature of the most recent monasteries of the Monastic Family of Bethlehem

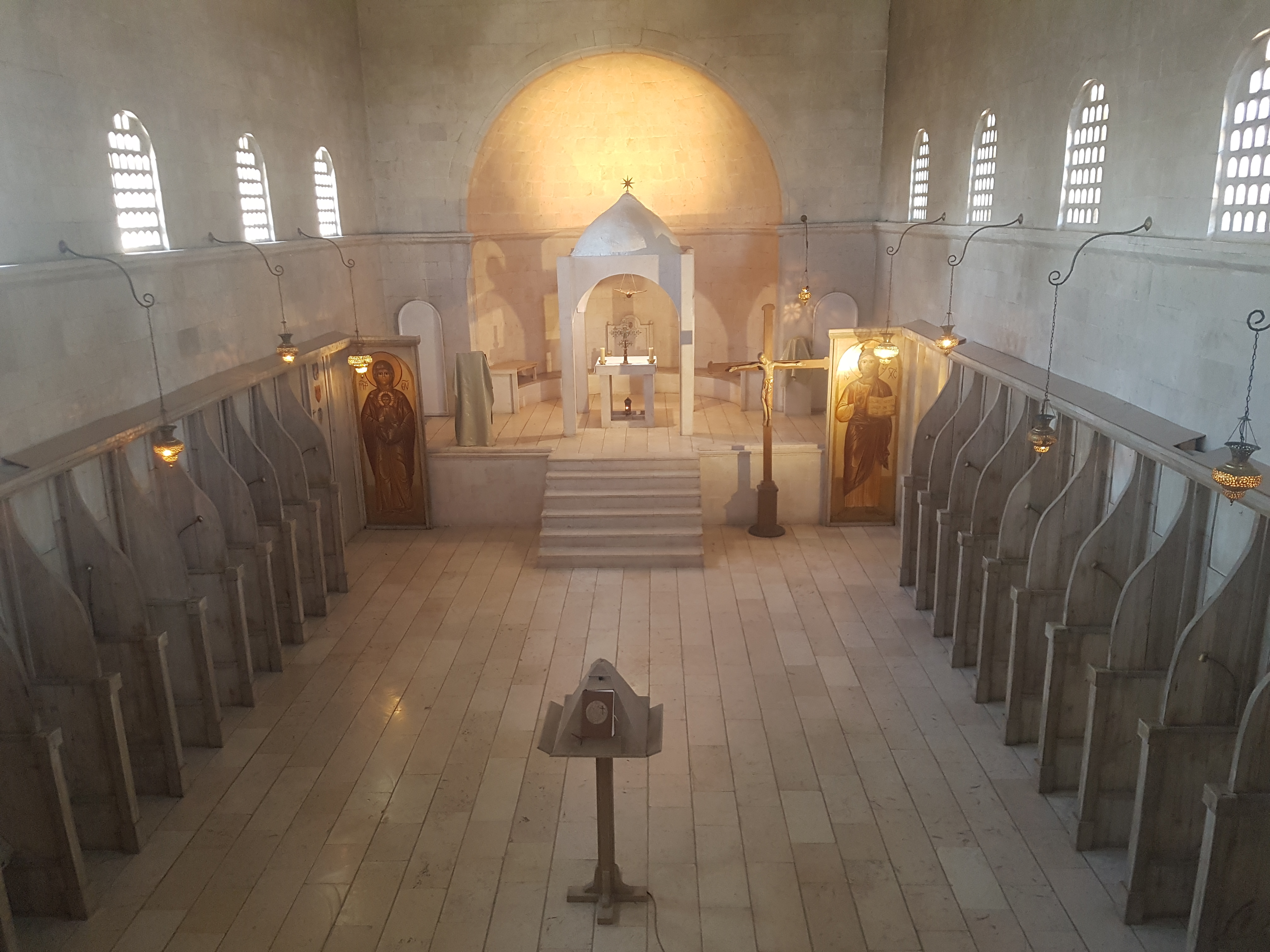
Typical chapels architecture of the Monastic Family of Bethlehem

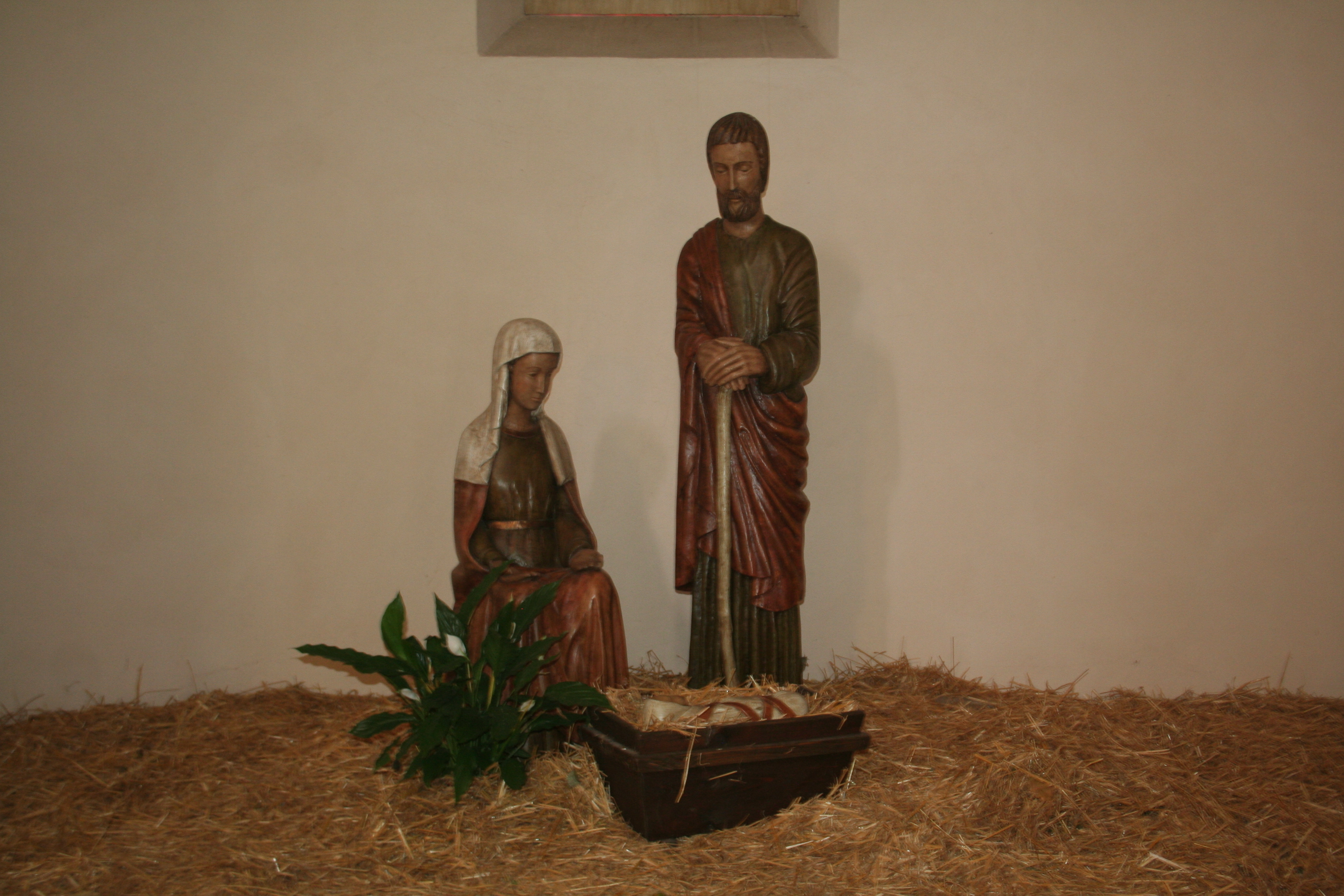
Model of a stylized nativity scene usually sculpted by the Monastic Sisters of Bethlehem

The first community of Monastic Sisters of Bethlehem began in 1951. The first community of Monastic Brothers of Bethlehem (or Monks) was founded in 1976, in the Chartreuse Mountains. In 2023, the Monastic Family of Bethlehem numbered 580 members, of which 550 were nuns and around 30 were monks. They live in 29 nunneries and 3 monasteries of brothers located in 15 different countries.

=== The monasteries of the Monastic Brothers of Bethlehem ===
- 1976 – Monastère de l'Assomption Notre-Dame – Currière-en-Chartreuse, Saint-Pierre-de-Chartreuse (Diocese of Grenoble-Vienne)
- 1989 – Monastero dell'Assunta Incoronata – Monte Corona, Umbertide (Archdiocese of Perugia-Città della Pieve)
- 1999 – Monastère de Notre-Dame de Maranatha – Beit Shemesh (Latin Patriarch of Jerusalem)

=== The monasteries of the Monastic Sisters of Bethlehem ===
- 1967 – Monastère de Notre-Dame de la Gloire-Dieu – Les Montvoirons, Boëge (Diocese of Annecy)
- 1968 – Monastère de Notre-Dame de la Présence de Dieu, Paris (Archdiocese of Paris)
- 1970 – Monastère de Notre-Dame de Bethléem - Poligny, Seine-et-Marne (Diocese of Meaux)
- 1971 – Monastère de Notre-Dame de l'Unité – Pugny (Diocese of Chambéry)
- 1974 – Monastère de Notre-Dame du Buisson Ardent – Currière-en-Chartreuse, Saint-Laurent-du-Pont (Diocese of Grenoble-Vienne)
- 1977 – Monastère de Notre-Dame de Pitié – Mougères, Caux, Hérault (Archdiocese of Montpellier)
- 1978 – Monastère de Notre-Dame du Torrent de Vie – Le Thoronet (Diocese of Fréjus-Toulon)
- 1981 – Monastero della Madonna del Deserto – Monte Camporeggiano, Gubbio (Diocese of Gubbio)
- 1982 – Monastère de Notre-Dame d’Adoration – Le Val Saint Benoît, Épinac (Diocese of Autun)
- 1982 – Monastère de Notre-Dame de Clémence – La Verne, Collobrières (Diocese of Fréjus-Toulon)
- 1985 – Monastère de Notre-Dame de l'Assomption – The Mother House, Beit Shemesh (Latin Patriarch of Jerusalem)
- 1985 – Kloster Maria im Paradies – Kinderalm, Sankt Veit im Pongau (Archdiocese of Salzburg)
- 1987 – Monastery of Bethlehem – Our Lady of Lourdes – Camp Road, Livingston Manor, Sullivan County, New York (Archdiocese of New York)
- 1988 – Monastère de l'Assunta Gloriosa – Sari (Diocese of Ajaccio)
- 1991 – Monastère de Notre-Dame du Saint Désert en Chartreuse, Saint-Laurent-du-Pont (Diocese of Grenoble-Vienne)
- 1991 – Kloster Marienheide - Wollstein (Diocese of Fulda)
- 1992 – Monasterio de Santa María en la Santisima Trinidad - Merlo (Diocese of San Luis)
- 1993 – Monastère de Sainte Marie Reine des coeurs – Chertsey, Quebec (Diocese of Joliette)
- 1994 – Monastère de Notre-Dame de l'Aurore – Paparčiai, Kaišiadorys District Municipality (Diocese of Kaišiadorys)
- 1998 – Monaster Najświętszej Dziewicy na Pustyni – Szemud (Archdiocese of Gdańsk)
- 1998 – Monastère du Désert de l'Immaculée – Saint-Pé-de-Bigorre (Diocese of Tarbes-et-Lourdes)
- 1999 – Monastère de Notre-Dame du Fiat – Zutendaal (Diocese of Hasselt)
- 1999 – Monasterio de Santa María del Paraiso – Casilla (Diocese of Valparaíso)
- 2002 – Monasterio de la Cartuja Nuestra Senora de la Defension – Jerez de la Frontera (Diocese of Jerez)
- 2006 – Monastère de Lavra Netofa – Lavra Netofa, Deir Hanna (Latin Patriarch of Jerusalem)
- 2009 – Sanctuaire Notre-Dame de Palestine – Beit Shemesh (Latin Patriarch of Jerusalem)
- 2011 – Monasterio de las Monjas de Belén – Los Hornos, Valle de Vázquez, Tlaquiltenango (Diocese of Cuernavaca)
- 2013 – Mosteiro de Nossa Senhora do Rosário – Couço, Coruche (Archdiocese of Evora)
- Monasterio Santa María del Tepeyac - Jocotepec, Jalisco

== See also ==
- Enclosed religious orders
