= Luigi Barlassina =

Italian priest

His Beatitude Luigi Barlassina
- Latin Patriarch of Jerusalem
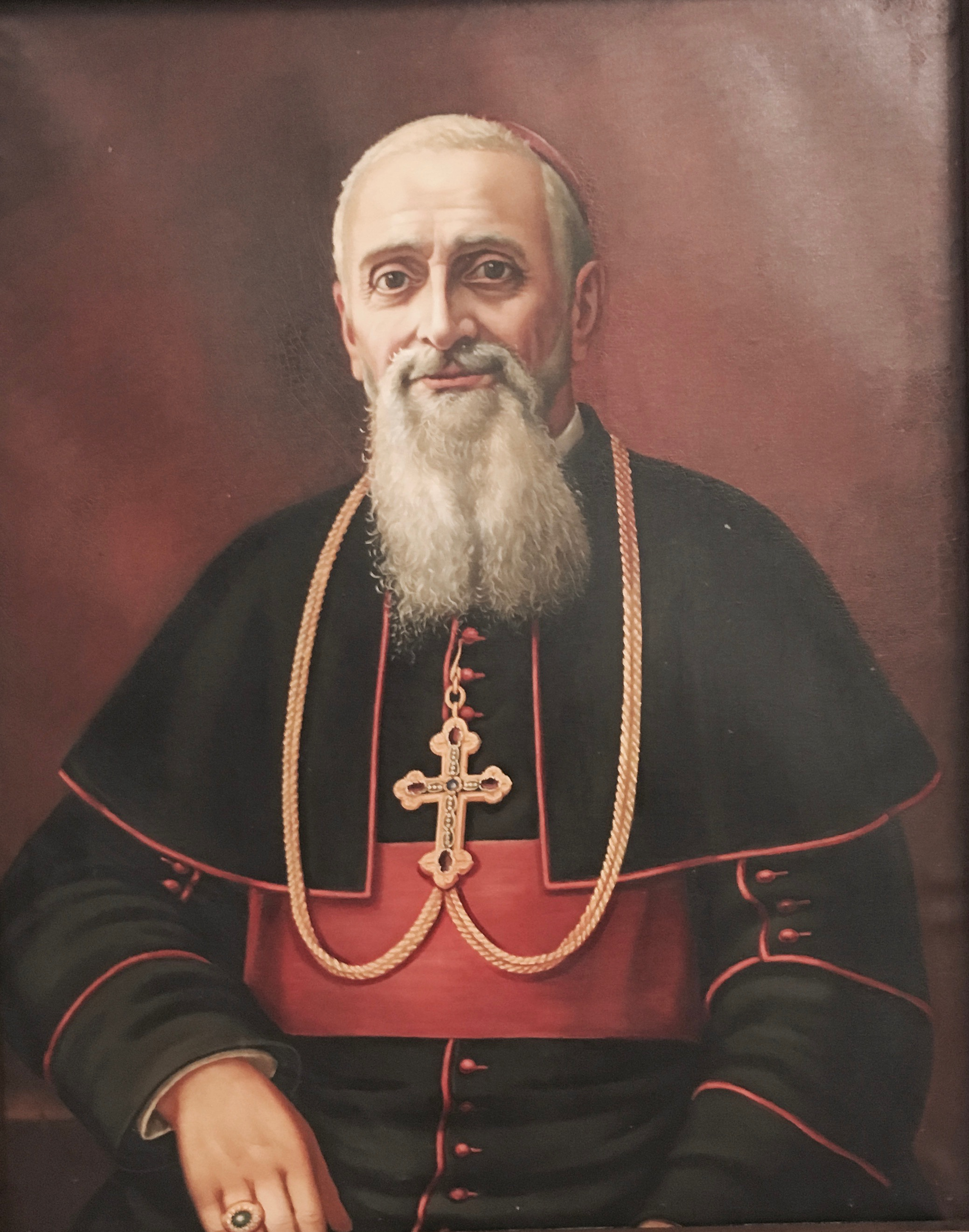
- Portrait of Luigi Barlassina
- Church: Catholic Church
- In office: 1920 to 1947
- Predecessor: Filippo Camassei
- Successor: Alberto Gori
- Other posts: Rector of the Order of the Holy Sepulchre (1928–1947); Titular Bishop of Capharnaum (1918–1947)

Orders
- Ordination: 22 December 1894
- Consecration: 8 September 1918 by Basilio Pompili

Personal details
- Born: 30 April 1872 Turin, Piedmont, Kingdom of Italy
- Died: 27 September 1947 (aged 75) Jerusalem, Mandatory Palestine

Luigi Barlassina (also Latinized as Aloysius Barlassina; 30 April 1872 – 27 September 1947) was an Italian Catholic prelate who was Latin Patriarch of Jerusalem from 1920 until his death in 1947.

== Biography ==
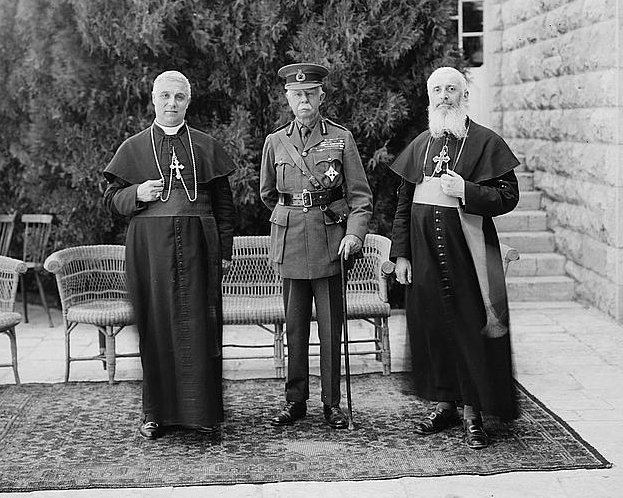
Barlassina (right) with Lord Plumer, High Commissioner of Palestine, and Cardinal Ascalesi, Archbishop of Naples, in 1926

Barlassina was born on 30 April 1872 in Turin, Italy. He received his ordination on 22 December 1894 and later became Ph.D. in theology and canon law. In 1911 he worked at the Spiritual College of the Congregation for the Evangelization of Peoples in Rome and from 1912 to 1918 at Vicario Curato at the Lateran Basilica.

In 1918, Pope Benedict XV appointed him Titular bishop of Capharnaum and appointed him Auxiliary bishop in Jerusalem. He received his episcopal consecration by Cardinal Basilio Pompili on 8 September 1918 in Rome. In 1919, Barlassina became Apostolic Administrator of Jerusalem and he was in 1920 by Pope Pius XI appointed Patriarch of Jerusalem, the only non-titular Latin patriarch in the East. Barlassina was known to be an anti-Zionist and his office promoted the reading of The Protocols of the Elders of Zion, an antisemitic fabricated text.

From 1928 until his death in 1947, he was also rector and permanent administrator of the Order of the Holy Sepulchre in Jerusalem (though not grand master).

Catholic Church titles
Preceded by Filippo Camassei	Latin Patriarch of Jerusalem; 1920–1947	Succeeded by Alberto Gori
