= William Hanna Shomali =

Palestinian Catholic prelate (born 1950)

His Beatitude William Hanna Shomali
- Titular Bishop of Lydda
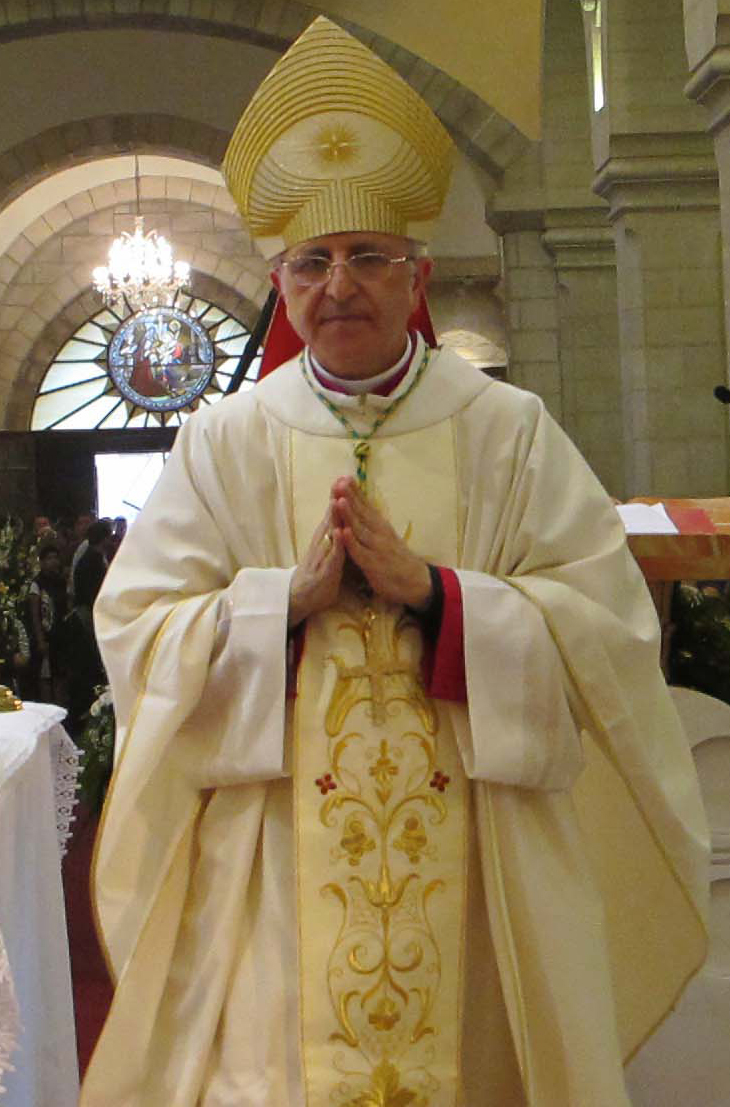
- Appointed: 31 March 2010

Orders
- Ordination: 24 June 1972
- Consecration: 27 May 2010

Personal details
- Born: 15 May 1950 (age 76) Beit Sahour, Palestinian Authority
- Denomination: Roman Catholic Church
- Motto: Rogate pacem Jerusalem
- Coat of arms: William Hanna Shomali's coat of arms

William Hanna Shomali (born 15 May 1950 in Beit Sahour, West Bank) is a Palestinian Catholic prelate who serves as an auxiliary bishop for the Latin Patriarchate of Jerusalem. Born in 1950 and ordained priest on June 24, 1972, he has served for eight years in the parishes of Jordan, 19 years as professor then as rector of the Seminary of Beit Jala, and then became General Administrator.

== Biography ==
In 1961 William Hanna Shomali entered the Minor Seminary of Beit Jala, and later the seminary of Beit Jala. After completing his studies in philosophy and theology he received his ordination to priesthood on 24 June 1972. Shomali was then appointed chaplain in Zarqa, Jordan and pastor in Shatana, Jordan. In 1980 he completed a postgraduate degree in English Literature from Yarmouk University and was a lecturer and later director of the Minor Seminary of Beit Jala. In 1989 Shomali completed a Doctorate in Liturgical Studies at the Pontifical Atheneum of St. Anselm in Rome and worked as a professor of liturgy, Vice-Rector and dean of studies at the Faculty of Philosophy and Theology of the Major Seminary of Beit Jala.

In 1998 he became General Administrator and Economist of the Latin Patriarchate of Jerusalem. Shomali was appointed rector of the Latin Patriarchate Seminary in Beit Jala in 2005. In 2009 he was appointed Chancellor of the Latin Patriarchate of Jerusalem.

=== Modern career ===
Pope Benedict XVI appointed William Hanna Shomali on 31 March 2010 as Titular bishop of Lydda (titular see) and ordered him in succession to Kamal Hanna Bathish as Auxiliary bishop in the Latin Patriarchate of Jerusalem. Shomali became responsible as Patriarchal Vicar for Israel, the Palestinian territories, Jordan and Cyprus. He received his episcopal consecration on 27 May of the same year by the Latin Patriarch of Jerusalem, Fouad Twal, in Bethlehem; his Co-consecrators were the two auxiliary bishops in the Latin Patriarchate of Jerusalem, Salim Sayegh and Giacinto Boulos-Marcuzzo.

In his role as Auxiliary Bishop of Jerusalem, Shomali has been interviewed in the press about various Middle Eastern topics, including the Pope's visit to the Palestinians, World Youth Day, Palestinians in Israel and the conflict in the Gaza Strip.

On February 8, 2017, Bishop Shomali was nominated as Patriarchal Vicar for Jordan by Archbishop Pierbattista Pizzaballa, Apostolic Administrator of Latin Patriarchate, succeeding Bishop Maroun Lahham who had resigned two days earlier on February 6, 2017.
