= Robert P. Maginnis =

Catholic bishop (1933–2022)

His Excellency, The Most Reverend Robert Patrick Maginnis
- Auxiliary Bishop of Philadelphia; Titular Bishop of Siminina
- Archdiocese: Philadelphia
- Appointed: January 24, 1996
- Installed: March 11, 1996
- Term ended: June 8, 2010
- Other post: Titular Bishop of Siminina (1996–2022)

Orders
- Ordination: May 13, 1961 by John Krol
- Consecration: March 11, 1996 by Anthony Bevilacqua, Francis B. Schulte, and Edward Peter Cullen

Personal details
- Born: December 22, 1933 Philadelphia, Pennsylvania, U.S.
- Died: September 14, 2022 (aged 88) Darby, Pennsylvania, U.S.
- Motto: Stay with us Lord

Styles of Robert Patrick Maginnis
- Reference style: His Excellency; The Most Reverend
- Spoken style: Your Excellency
- Religious style: Bishop

Robert Patrick Maginnis (December 22, 1933 – September 14, 2022) was an American prelate of the Roman Catholic Church. He served as an auxiliary bishop of the Archdiocese of Philadelphia from 1996 to 2010.

== Early life and education ==
Robert Maginnis was born in Philadelphia, Pennsylvania, the youngest of four children of William and Cecilia Maginnis. He received his early education at St. Aloysius Academy in West Chester, Pennsylvania. In 1948, he enrolled at St. Joseph's Preparatory School in Philadelphia. After graduating from St. Joseph's in 1952, he began his studies for the priesthood at St. Charles Borromeo Seminary in the Overbrook section of Philadelphia. He earned a Bachelor of Arts degree in 1955.

== Priesthood ==
Maginnis was ordained a priest for the Archdiocese of Philadelphia by Archbishop John Krol on May 13, 1961. He was a member of the first ordination class ordained by Archbishop Krol. After his ordination, Maginnis was assigned as a curate at Our Lady Help of Christians Parish in Abington, Pennsylvania, where he remained for three years. He then served at Immaculate Heart of Mary Parish in Chester, Pennsylvania, from 1964 to 1967. In 1967, Maginnis was named assistant director of the Archdiocesan Department of Youth Activities. He later became director of the department in 1981, serving in that position until 1988.

Maginnis was elevated to the rank of honorary prelate to his holiness on April 24, 1982. From 1988 to 1991, he served as administrator of St. Alphonsus Parish in Maple Glen, Pennsylvania. He became regional vicar for Montgomery County, Pennsylvania in 1991. He also served as chairman of the state chapter of the Catholic Youth Organization, chairman of the Catholic Charities Appeal, archdiocesan moderator of the St. Vincent de Paul Society, and a member of the city's Youth Services Commission.

== Auxiliary Bishop of Philadelphia ==
On January 24, 1996, Maginnis was appointed an auxiliary bishop of the Archdiocese of Philadelphia and titular bishop of Siminina by Pope John Paul II. He received his episcopal consecration on March 11, 1996, from Cardinal Anthony Bevilacqua, with Archbishop Francis B. Schulte and Bishop Edward Cullen serving as co-consecrators, at the Cathedral Basilica of SS. Peter and Paul in Philadelphia. He selected as his episcopal motto: "Stay with us, Lord" from Luke 24:29. In addition to his episcopal duties, Maginnis served as pastor of St. Colman Parish in Ardmore, Pennsylvania, from 1996 to 2004.

In 2004, Maginnis was named head of the Secretariat for Evangelization. He also oversaw the Archdiocesan Metropolitan Tribunal, Chancery Office, the Office for Consecrated Life, the Office for Research and Planning, the Office for Black Catholics, and the Office for Hispanic Catholics.

== Retirement ==
Upon reaching the mandatory retirement age of 75, Maginnis submitted his letter of resignation to the Pope in December 2008. His resignation was accepted by Pope Benedict XVI on June 8, 2010. He was to continue to administer confirmations in Chester and Delaware Counties, and spend the rest of his retirement reading and studying. He was replaced as an auxiliary bishop by Monsignor John J. McIntyre.

Maginnise died at Villa Saint Joseph in Darby, Pennsylvania after suffering a lengthy illness. His funeral is due to be held at the Cathedral Basilica of SS. Peter and Paul. Nelson J. Perez, Archbishop of Philadelphia, paid tribute to Maginnis as a "man of great joy and charity" who possessed the "true spirit of a missionary disciple".

== See also ==
- Catholic Church hierarchy
- Catholic Church in the United States
- Historical list of the Catholic bishops of the United States
- List of Catholic bishops of the United States
- Lists of patriarchs, archbishops, and bishops

Catholic Church titles
Preceded by –	Auxiliary Bishop of Philadelphia; 1996–2010	Succeeded by –
Preceded by Giacinto-Boulos Marcuzzo	Auxiliary Bishop of Siminina; 1996–2022	Succeeded by Vacant
