= Jean-Baptiste Gourion =

Roman Catholic auxiliary bishop

His Excellency, The Most Reverend Jean-Baptiste Gourion OSB Oliv.
- Auxiliary Bishop of Latin Patriarchate of Jerusalem
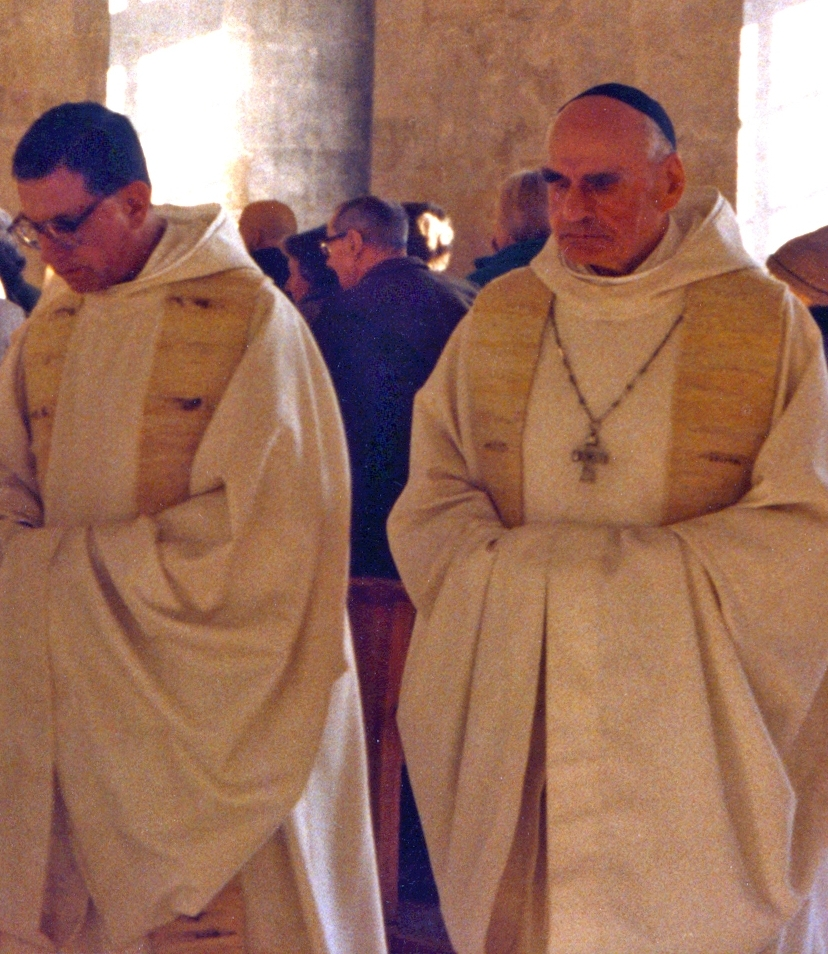
- Dom Paul Grammont and Brother Jean-Baptiste Gourion at his right
- Church: Catholic Church
- Appointed: Bishop of Lydda
- Other post: Former Patriarchal Vicar of Hebrew-speaking catholics in Israel

Orders
- Ordination: 29 June 1967
- Consecration: 9 November 2003 by Patriarch Michel Sabbah
- Rank: Bishop

Personal details
- Born: 24 October 1934 Oran, French Algeria
- Died: 23 June 2005 (aged 70) Jerusalem
- Motto: In Jerusalem Consolabimini
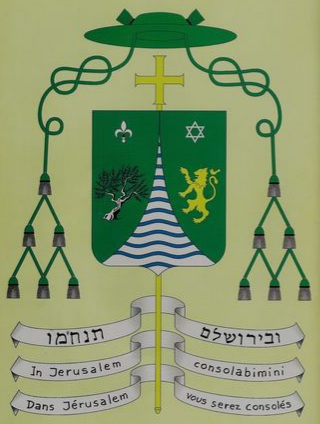
- Coat of arms

Jean-Baptiste Gourion, O.S.B. Oliv. (24 October 1934 – 23 June 2005) was a French Catholic Benedictine monk who served as an Auxiliary Bishop of the Latin Patriarchate of Jerusalem from 2003 until his death in 2005.

== Biography ==
Gourion was born in 1934 in Oran, Algeria, to a Jewish family, when Algeria was part of France. When studying medicine in France, he decided to enlist in the French Army during the Algerian War.

Gourion converted from Judaism to the Catholic Church in 1958. In 1961, he entered a Benedictine Monastery, and in 1967, he was ordained a priest. Gourion came to Israel in 1976 with two other monks in order to rebuild the old monastery in Abu Gosh and in 1999 was named its abbot.

In 2003, Gourion was nominated Auxiliary Bishop of the Latin Patriarchate of Jerusalem by Pope John Paul II. In the same year he was also appointed to the titular see of Lydda. His mission notably included care of Hebrew Catholics' spiritual necessities.

He died on 23 June 2005 at the age of 70.
