= Kamal Hanna Bathish =

Israeli-Arab Roman Catholic bishop (1931–2025)

His Excellency Kamal Hanna Bathish
- Auxiliary Bishop Emeritus of Jerusalem
- Appointed: 29 April 1993
- Term ended: 9 June 2007
- Predecessor: -
- Successor: -
- Other posts: Titular Bishop of Aurusuliana (1993–1994); Titular Bishop of Ierichus (1994–2025)

Orders
- Ordination: 29 June 1955 by Alberto Gori
- Consecration: 3 July 1993 by Michel Sabbah

Personal details
- Born: 6 December 1931 Nazareth, Mandatory Palestine
- Died: 23 June 2025 (aged 93) Jerusalem, Israel

Kamal-Hanna Bathish (Arabic: كمال حنا بطحيش, Hebrew: כמאל-חנא בטחיש; 6 December 1931 – 23 June 2025) was a Palestinian Catholic prelate who served as auxiliary bishop of the Latin Patriarch of Jerusalem from 1993 to 2007.

== Biography ==
Kamal-Hanna Bathish was born in Nazareth, Mandatory Palestine on 6 December 1931. In 1955, he was ordained to the priesthood. In 1993, he was appointed a bishop by Pope John Paul II. Bathish was appointed Titular Bishop of Aurusuliana and appointed auxiliary bishop of the Latin Patriarchate of Jerusalem. He received his episcopal consecration on 3 July 1993, by the Patriarch of Jerusalem, Michel Sabbah and his co-consecrators were Salim Sayegh and Guerino Dominique Picchi. On 29 October 1994, Kamal Hanna Bathish was appointed Titular Bishop of Ierichus. He continued to work in Jerusalem as a bishop until his retirement on 9 June 2007.

On 23 June 2025, Bathish died in Jerusalem, at the age of 93.

Catholic Church titles
| Preceded by — | Auxiliary Bishop of Jerusalem; 1993–2007 | Succeeded by — |
| Preceded by Edmund Michal Piszcz | Titular Bishop of Aurusuliana; 1993–1994 | Succeeded by Luciano Bux |
| Preceded by Filippo Pocci | Titular Bishop of Ierichus; 1994–2025 | Succeeded by Vacant |
