= John Grimes (bishop of Christchurch) =

First Roman Catholic bishop of Christchurch, New Zealand (1842–1915)

His Lordship John Grimes
- 1st Bishop of Christchurch
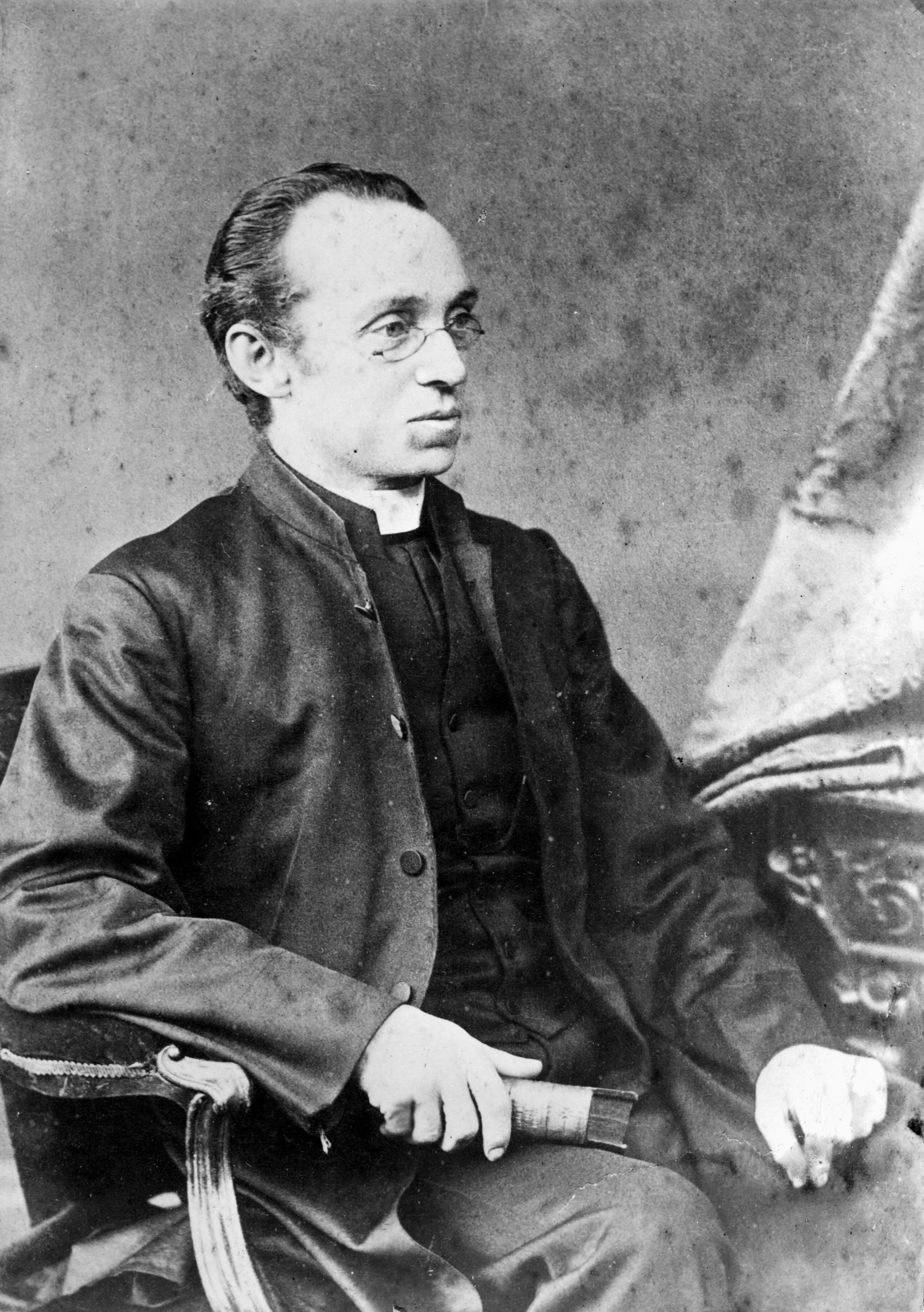
- John Grimes in 1887
- Diocese: Roman Catholic Diocese of Christchurch
- Installed: 1887
- Term ended: 1915
- Predecessor: New title
- Successor: Matthew Brodie

Personal details
- Born: 11 February 1842 London, England
- Died: 15 March 1915 (aged 73) Christchurch, New Zealand

John Joseph Grimes (11 February 1842 – 15 March 1915) was the first Roman Catholic bishop of Christchurch, New Zealand. Born in Bromley-by-Bow, London, he entered the Society of Mary (Marists), was professed on 29 April 1867, and was later ordained a priest. He became the superior of the house of studies founded by the Marists at Paignton in Devon, England.

The English-born Marist Francis Redwood (1839–1935), was appointed to be the second Catholic Bishop of Wellington, New Zealand in January 1874. He was consecrated bishop by Henry Edward Cardinal Manning at the Marist parish, St Anne's, Spitalfields, London, on 17 March 1874, and after touring France and Ireland to find funds and personnel, returned in November that year to New Zealand, where he had been raised for part of his childhood, to take up his new appointment.

It was a crucial period in the development of the Catholic Church in New Zealand and in 1885 the first plenary council of Australasian bishops recommended the creation of a coordinated ecclesiastical province in New Zealand by establishing of an archdiocese, of which the remaining New Zealand dioceses would become suffragan sees. The recommendation was that Dunedin become the new archdiocese, and that the appointment as archbishop go to a diocesan priest. Rome decided differently and while establishing an ecclesiastical province, centred it upon the city of Wellington, with the existing diocese of Wellington being raised to the rank of an archdiocese and a metropolitan see. The first archbishop was the incumbent Bishop of Wellington, Francis Redwood, appointed by a papal brief dated 13 May 1887.

Simultaneously, from the territory of the diocese of Wellington as hitherto defined there was created a new diocese of Christchurch. Redwood favoured the appointment as its first bishop the English Marist Father John Grimes, and his proposal was accepted by Rome and executed by a papal brief similarly dated 13 May 1887. Like Redwood over a decade earlier, Grimes was consecrated bishop at the Marist parish, St Anne's, Spitalfields, London, on 26 July 1887 by Herbert Vaughan, then Bishop of Salford, assisted by co-consecrators Bishop John Butt, Bishop of Southwark and James Laird Patterson Bishop of Emmaus in partibus and auxiliary bishop of Westminster.

Bishop Grimes died in office on 15 March 1915. He was buried in a chapel adjacent to the Cathedral of the Blessed Sacrament.

Catholic Church titles
New title	Bishop of Christchurch; 1887–1915	Succeeded by Matthew Brodie
