= Rafic Nahra =

Catholic auxiliary bishop

- Patriarchal Vicar for Israel; Auxiliary Bishop of Latin Patriarchate of Jerusalem; Titular Bishop of Verbe
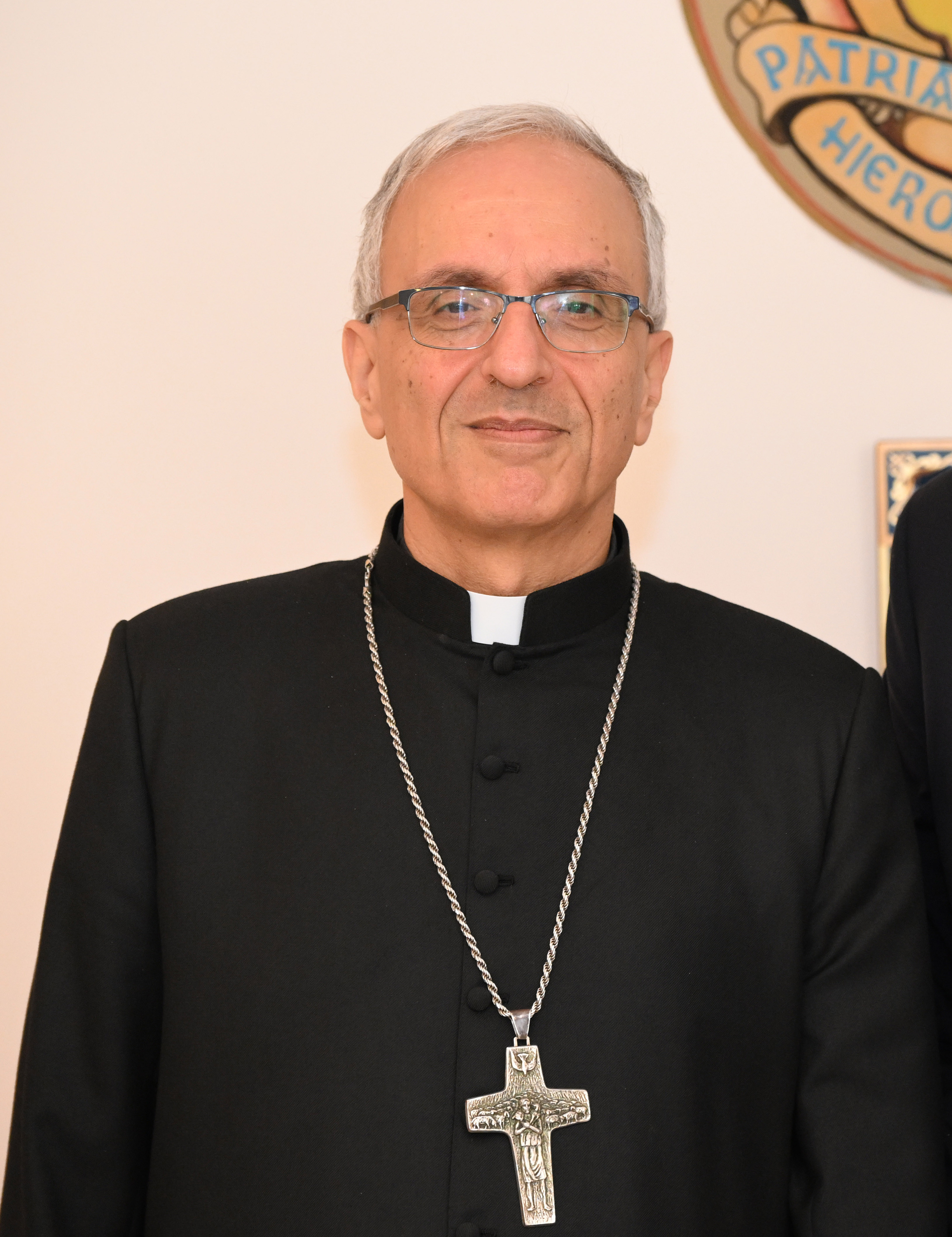
- Church: Catholic Church
- Appointed: 11 March 2022
- Predecessor: Pierbattista Pizzaballa
- Previous post: patriarchal vicar of Nazareth

Orders
- Ordination: 27 June 1992 by Cardinal Jean-Marie Lustiger
- Consecration: 30 April 2022 by Patriarch Pierbattista Pizzaballa
- Rank: Bishop

Personal details
- Born: January 27, 1959 (age 67) Ismaïlia, Egypt
- Motto: Ex me fructus tuus invenitur
- Coat of arms

Rafic Nahra (born 27 January 1959) is a Lebanese-French bishop of the Catholic Church, who serves as patriarchal vicar for Israel and auxiliary bishop of the Latin Patriarchate of Jerusalem. From 2017 to 2021, he served as patriarchal vicar for the Hebrew Catholics. He has been patriarchal vicar for Israel, based in Nazareth, since August 2021, and auxiliary bishop of the Latin Patriarchate of Jerusalem since 11 March 2022.

== Biography ==
Born on 27 January 1959 in Ismailia, Egypt, to a Lebanese family, Rafic Nahra grew up in Lebanon and moved to France at the age of 20, where he obtained a doctorate in engineering in 1985 from the École des Ponts et Chaussées, a profession he held for two years in the Geodia Institute.

In 1987, he entered the seminary in the French capital and was sent to Rome to pursue ecclesiastical studies. He obtained in 1991 a bachelor's degree in theology from the Gregorian University and in 1994 a master's degree in Sacred Scripture from the Biblical Institute in Rome. In the framework of his studies, he was sent to Jerusalem from February to September 1993.

Ordained priest for the diocese of Paris, in 1992, by Cardinal Jean-Marie Lustiger, he was assigned to various pastoral and academic missions. From 1994 to 2001, he was a spiritual director at the "Maison Saint-Augustin" and taught Biblical exegesis at the École Cathédrale of Paris. From 2001 to 2004 he was vicar in the parish St François de Molitor, while teaching biblical exegesis.

In 2004, he returned to the Holy Land to pursue a master's degree in Jewish Thought at the Hebrew University of Jerusalem. During this period, he served the Maronite parish in Jerusalem and began his pastoral service at the Saint James Vicariate for the Hebrew Speaking Catholics up to 2007.

From September 2007 to September 2011, he served six months a year as a vicar at the Parish Saint-Augustin, while teaching and being in charge of the department of research "Judaism and Christianity" at the Collège des Bernardins in Paris, and spent the other six months in pastoral service at the Saint James Vicariate, while preparing a Doctorate of Philosophy, in Judeo-Arabic literature, at the Hebrew University of Jerusalem. From 2011 to 2014, he focused on his doctoral studies which he completed in 2016.

From September 2014, he was appointed parish priest of the Hebrew-speaking Catholic Community of Jerusalem, whose gathering place is in the St. Simeon and Anna convent.

When Father David Neuhaus resigned from his office as patriarchal vicar in September 2017, he was appointed to replace him as coordinator for the Pastoral of Migrants.

On October 21, 2017, the Apostolic Administrator of the Latin Patriarchate of Jerusalem, Archbishop Pierbattista Pizzaballa, appointed him as Patriarchal Vicar for the Saint James Vicariate for the Hebrew speaking Catholics in Israel and, from Pentecost 2018, as Patriarchal Vicar for the Migrants and Asylum seekers in Israel.

In addition, Father Rafic Nahra speaks five languages: Arabic, Hebrew, French, English and Italian.
