= Marcuzzo =

Marcuzzo is an Italian surname. Notable people with the surname include:

- Giacinto-Boulos Marcuzzo (born 1945), Italian Roman Catholic Auxiliary Bishop of the Latin Patriarchate of Jerusalem
- Riccardo Marcuzzo (born 1992), Italian singer and songwriter
