= Diocese of Emmaus =

Roman Catholic titular see

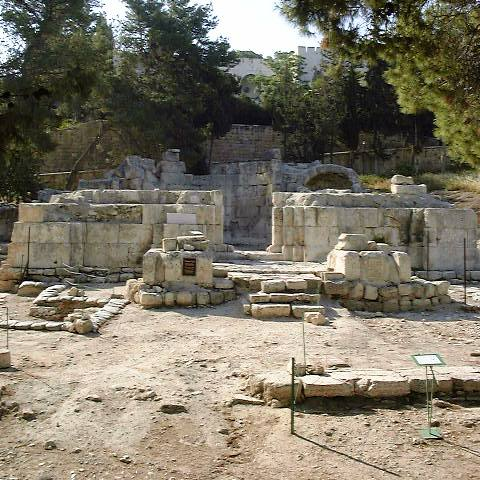
Ruins of the basilica in Emmaus.

The Diocese of Emmaus is an ancient and titular diocese of the Roman Catholic Church, located in Emmaus/Nicopolis, Israel, (modern Imwas). The current bishop is Giacinto-Boulos Marcuzzo who resides in Nazareth.

== History ==
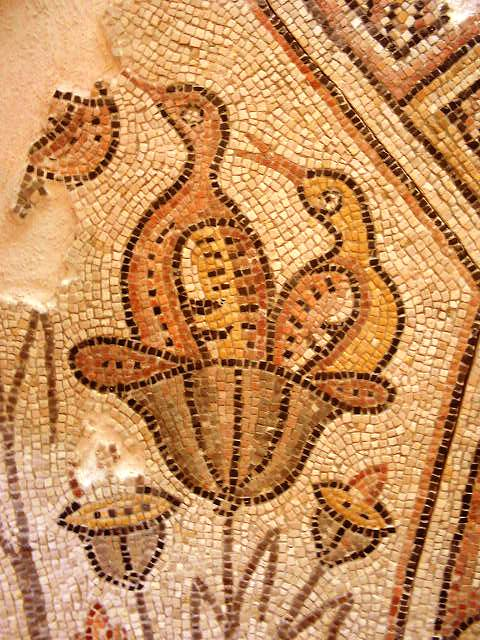
Emmaus was very early associated with early Christianity, mentioned in 1 Maccabees Sozomen and Eusebius and in Book of Luke 24:13-35, of the New Testament.

Being a small town only 7.5 mi (12.1 km) from Jerusalem, the village of Emmaus was not initially a bishopric, but rather part of the bishopric of Jerusalem.

In 131 CE, Christian scholar and writer Julius Africanus of Jerusalem, headed an embassy to Rome and had an interview with the Roman emperor Elagabalus on behalf of Emmaus. Soon after it was refounded to become a "city" (πόλις), which quickly became famous, and was given the qualification of "Nicopolis".

Eusebius a century later writes

Emmaus, whence was Cleopas who is mentioned by the Evangelist Luke. Today it is Nicopolis, a famous city of Palestine.

Jerome described how the towns congregation "consecrated the house of Cleopas as a church."

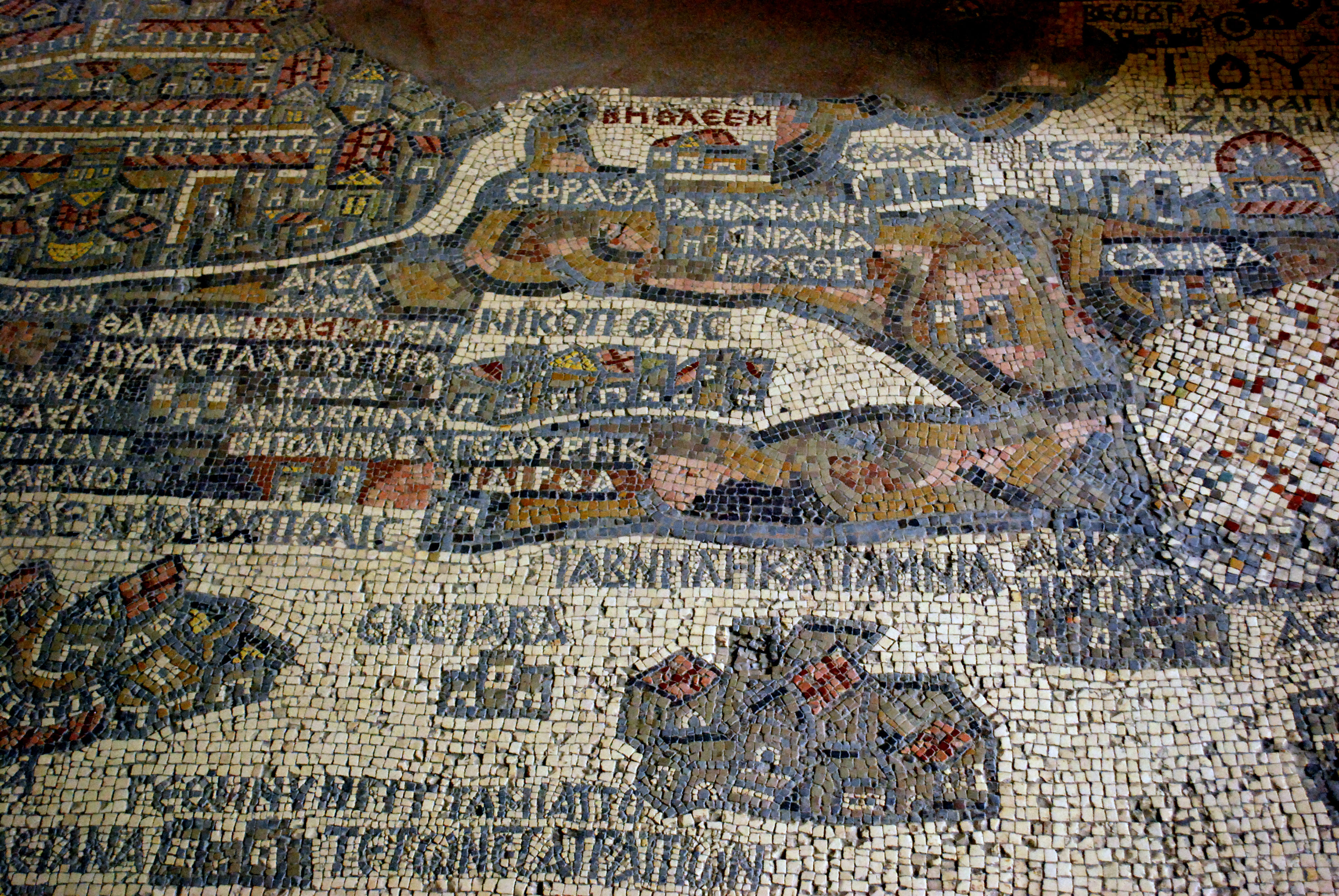
Emmaus Nicopolis on Madaba map

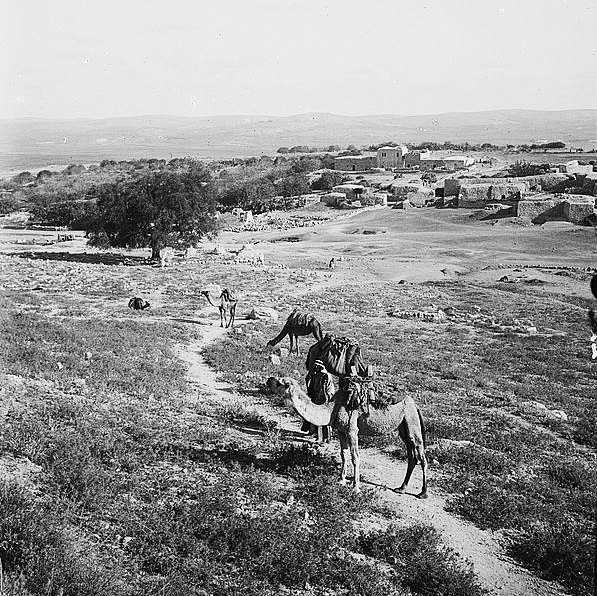
Emmaus, early 20th century

The bishopric of Emmaus was mentioned by St. Jerome, Hesychius of Jerusalem, Theophanes the Confessor, Sozomen, and Theodosius.

In 222 CE, a basilica was erected there, which was rebuilt first by the Byzantines and later modified by the Crusaders. This Diocese, however, must not have been of significance, being represented at only one of the first four councils nor mentioned by Michel Le Quien but was in the Notitiae Ecclesiastica.

The ancient bishopric ended when the Islamic armies entered the city. At the time of the Muslim conquest of Palestine, the main encampment of the Arab army was established in Emmaus, when a plague struck, killing as many as 25,000 of the army.

In the 7th century both Willibald of Eichstätt and Hugeburc von Heidenheim, in her The Life of St. Willibald both describe the town church and "holy well".

The church was one of 30,000 Christian buildings destroyed in 1009AD by al-Hakim bi-Amr Allah, the Fatimid caliph of Egypt.

In the 12th century William of Tyre, described the abundance of water and fodder in the area around the town, and Daniel Kievsky wrote of the site, "but now all is destroyed by the pagans and the village of Emmaus is empty." John Phocas (ca.1185) also described the town.

The Bishopric was re-established in 1099 when the army of the First Crusade, arrived in the town. But came under the rule of the Ottoman Empire in the early 16th century and, the church built by the Crusaders converted into a mosque.

In 1930, the Carmelite Order built a monastery, the House of Peace, on a tract of land purchased in the town in 1878. Three years later it was established as a titular see in the Roman Catholic Church.

== Known bishops ==
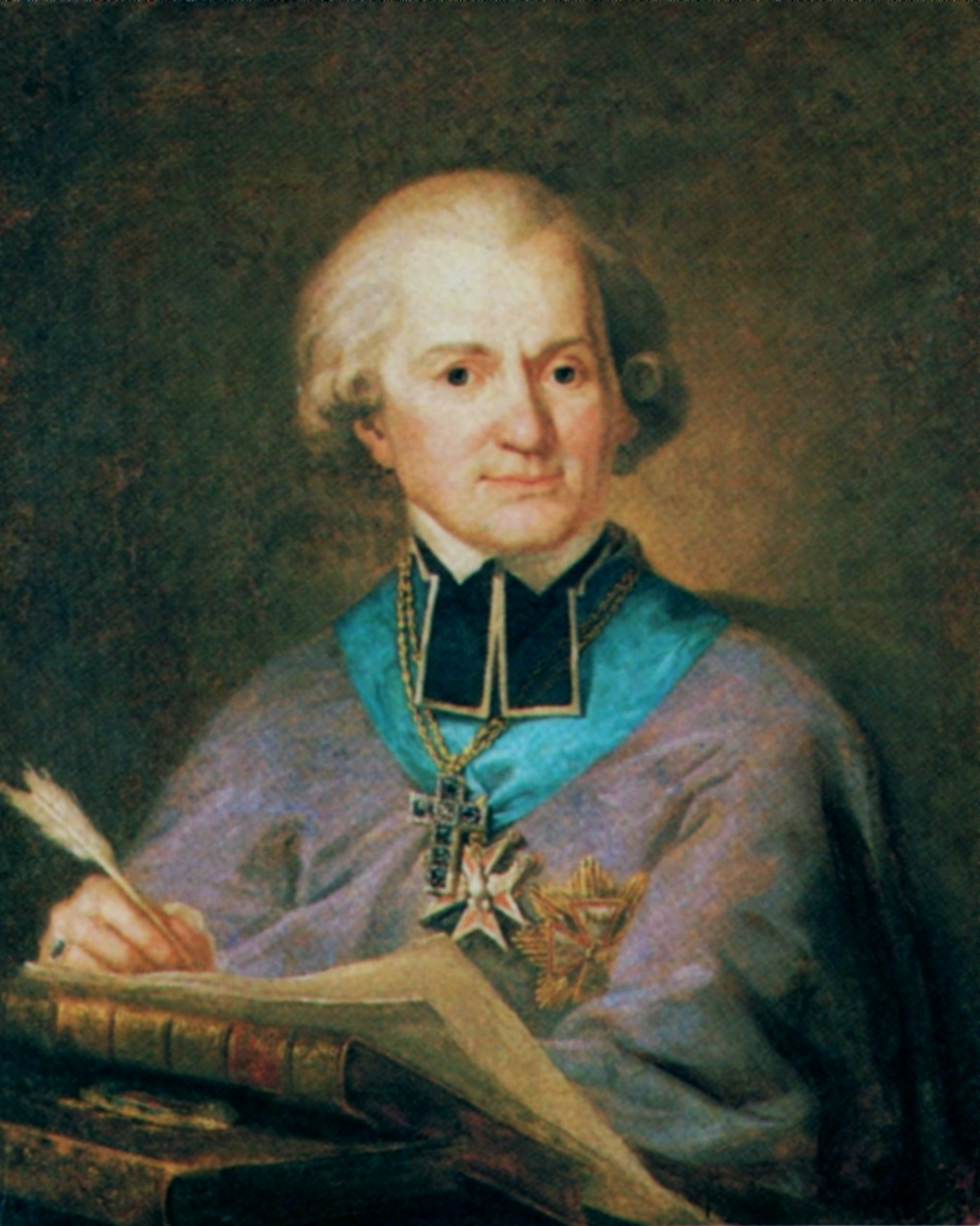
Adam Naruszewicz

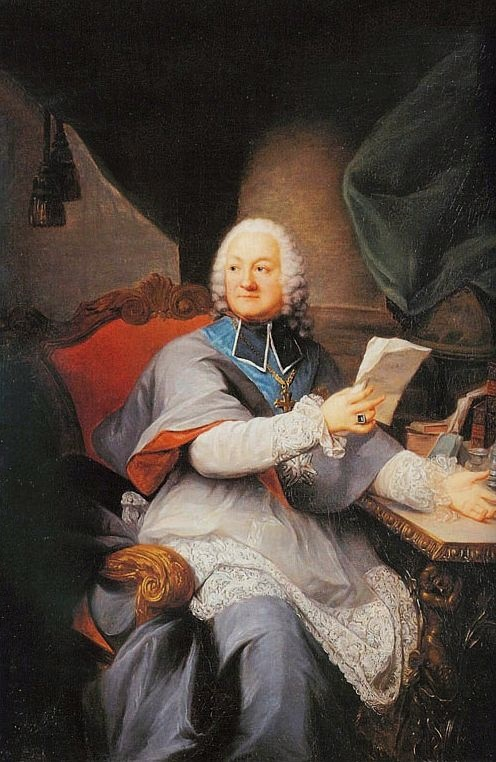
Kajetan Sołtyk

=== Ancient diocese ===
- Petros Longius, bishop of Nikopolis attendee at the Council of Nicaea.

=== Titular Catholic see ===
- Bartolomeo Fargna (7 February 1729 – 1730)
- Lothar Friedrich von Nalbach (2 October 1730 – 11 May 1748)
- Kajetan Ignacy Sołtyk (22 September 1749 – 19 April 1756)
- Franciszek Kobielski (28 January 1760 – 1 May 1766)
- Adam Stanisław Naruszewicz (13 March 1775 – 28 November 1788)
- Johann Maximilian von Haunold (18 June 1792 – 20 January 1807)
- Jean-Denis Gauthier (10 December 1839 – 8 December 1877)
- Henricus den Dubbelden (14 January 1842 – 13 October 1851)
- James Laird Patterson (20 April 1880 – 3 December 1902)
- Algernon Charles Stanley (12 February 1903 – 23 April 1928)
- Giuseppe Signore (1 December 1928 – 11 August 1944)
- Joseph Patrick Donahue (27 January 1945 – 26 April 1959)
- Jolando Nuzzi (8 August 1959 – 20 May 1961)
- Carlo Maccari (10 June 1961 – 31 October 1963)
- Franco Costa (18 December 1963 – 22 January 1977)
- Giacinto-Boulos Marcuzzo

== Church buildings ==
- Emmaus Nicoplis, Latrun, Betharram/Beatitudes
- Emmaus Qubeibeh, Qubeibeh, Franciscans

== See also ==
- Catholic Church in Israel
- Custody of the Holy Land.
