= David Neuhaus =

South African theologian

The Reverend David Neuhaus S.J.
- Former Superior of Holy Land Jesuits
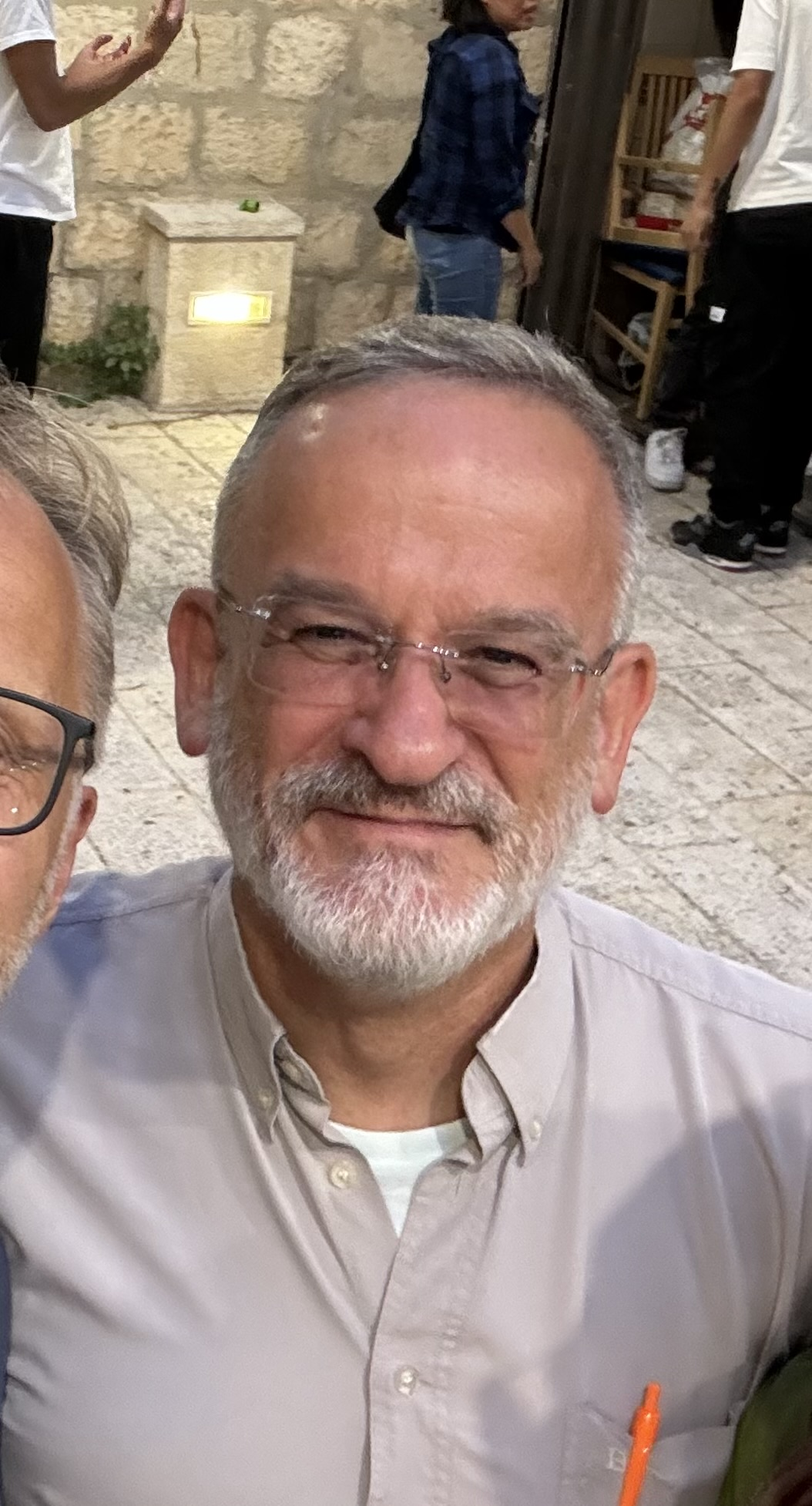
- David Neuhaus in May 2024
- Native name: דוד נויהאוז
- Church: Catholic Church
- Appointed: 31 July 2019
- Other post: Former Patriarchal Vicar of Hebrew-speaking catholics in Israel

Orders
- Ordination: 8 September 2000 by Latin Patriarch of Jerusalem Michel Sabbah

Personal details
- Born: April 25, 1962 (age 64) Johannesburg, South Africa

David Mark Neuhaus, SJ (Hebrew: דוד נויהאוז; born 25 April 1962) is a German-South African-Israeli Catholic priest who served as superior of the Jesuit community at the Pontifical Biblical Institute in Jerusalem. From 2009 to 2017, he served as patriarchal vicar for Hebrew-speaking Catholics in the Latin Patriarchate of Jerusalem.

== Life ==
David Neuhaus, the son of German Jews, was born in South Africa. At the age of 15, he moved to Israel; at 26, he converted to the Catholic faith. Neuhaus finished his studies in political science at the Hebrew University of Jerusalem with a doctorate. In 1992 he joined the Society of Jesus (SJ) and on August 20, 1994 made his perpetual vows.

After his theological and philosophical training and study of theology and Scripture at the Jesuits' Centre Sèvres in Paris and the Pontifical Biblical Institute in Rome, Neuhaus received on 8 September 2000 his priestly ordination.

Since 2001 he has taught at Bethlehem University the subjects "Introduction to Judaism" and "Introduction to the Old Testament" and Biblical Studies, at the Studium Theologicum Salesianum in Jerusalem, and at the Latin Patriarchate Seminary in Beit Jala. He was a research fellow at the Jewish Shalom Hartman Institute in Jerusalem.

On March 15, 2009 Neuhaus was appointed by the Latin Patriarch of Jerusalem, Fouad Twal, as patriarchal vicar for the local Hebrew-speaking Catholics.

In August 2017 he asked Archbishop Pierbattista Pizzaballa to relieve him of his charge as vicar.

== Sources ==
- Justice and the Intifada: Palestinians and Israelis Speak Out, Friendship Press 1991, ISBN 978-0-377-00237-1, along with Ghassan Rubeiz and Kathy Bergen.
- Critical solidarity: some reflections on the role of privileged Christians in the struggle of the dispossessed, Cultural Association Aphorism Trier 1995, ISBN 978-3-86575-104-1.
- Land, Bible and History, Cultural Association Aphorism Trier 2011, ISBN 978-3-86575-024-2, along with Alain Marchadour, AA.
