= Hebrew Catholics =

Jews who converted to the Catholic Church

Total population
- c. 1,000

Regions with significant populations
- Israel

Religions
- Catholic Church

Languages
- Hebrew, Neo-Aramaic, Russian, English, French

Related ethnic groups
- Israeli Jews; Other Israeli Christians; Palestinian Christians
- Prominent Communities: Church of San Giovanni Battista Decollato, also known as "Chiesa della Misericordia"

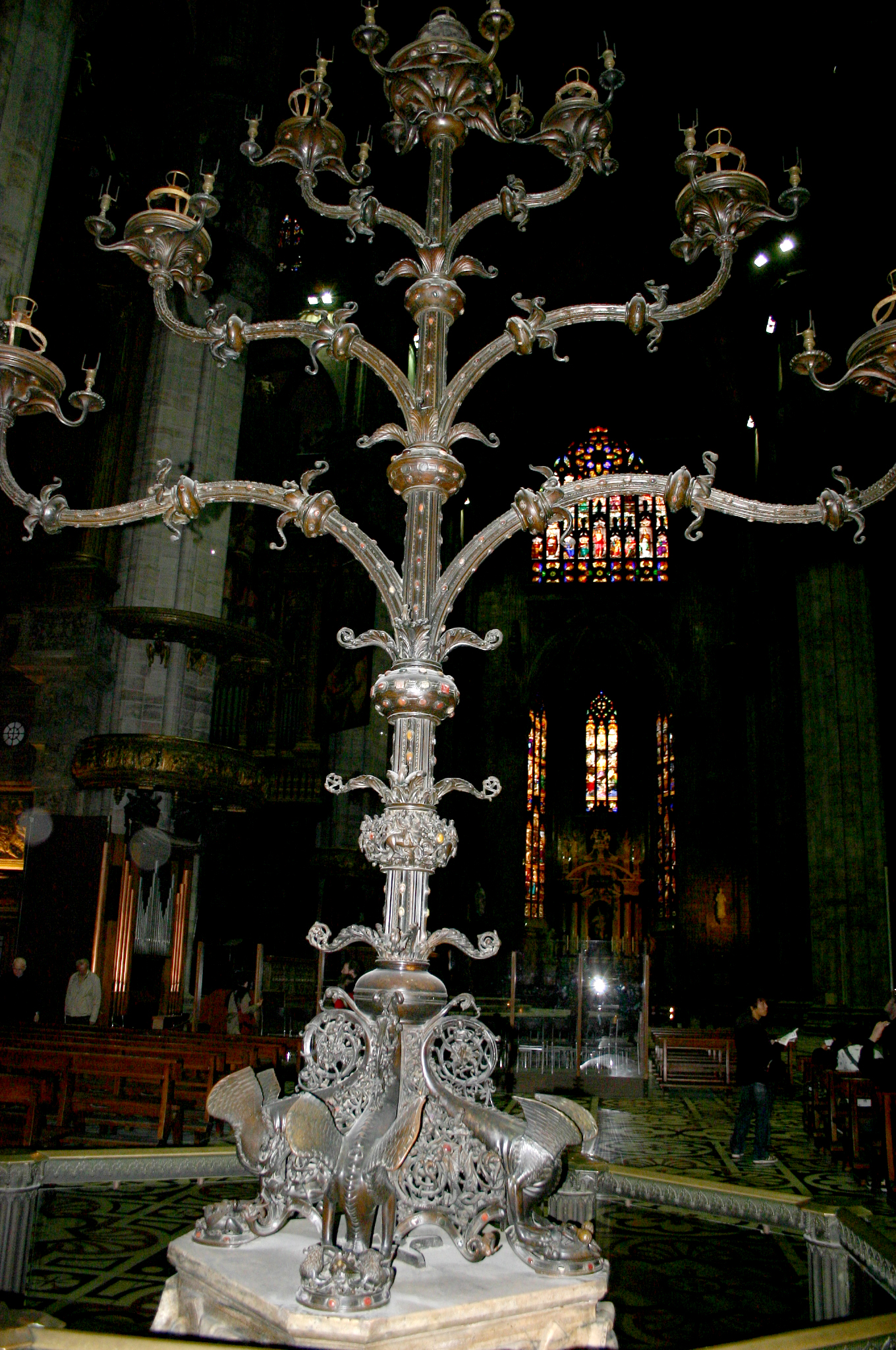
The Gothic-style Trivulzio chandler, an early 13th century work of art by an anonymous Anglo-Norman master. It is shaped as a menorah, as a symbol of the passage from the Old Covenant (with the Jews) to the New Covenant (with the Christian Church).

Hebrew Catholics (Hebrew: עברים קתולים, romanized: Ivrím Katolím) are a movement of Jews who have converted to Catholicism, and Catholics of non-Jewish origin, who choose to keep Mosaic traditions in light of Catholic doctrine. The phrase was coined by Father Elias Friedman (1987), who was himself a converted Jew. In the Holy Land, they are gathered in the Saint James Vicariate for Hebrew Speaking Catholics in Israel. There is also a branch of the international Association of Hebrew Catholics for activities related to the Hebrew inheritance in the Catholic Church (Yerushalom Havurah).

In 2013, there were approximately 500 Hebrew Catholics in Israel. By 2023, there were approximately 1,000.

== Beliefs ==
Besides the segments of other religious communities in Israel and besides the segments of communities of Christians in Israel, from most of the Eastern Orthodox Christian groups to groups of Hebrew Catholics, these converted Jews subscribe to the theological doctrines and dogma of the Roman Catholic faith and as a result, they are in full communion with the Pope. Many are culturally closely affiliated with Eastern Catholicism and Greek Orthodox Christianity communities in Israel. Their main point of differentiation as Hebrew Catholics does not lie in the dogmatic beliefs of the Church which they belong to, instead, it lies in their personal liturgical practices. For example, they may celebrate Hanukkah, and their liturgical calendar might differ from the liturgical calendar which is used by Latin Catholics because it retains certain Jewish holidays. As cultural Jews, Hebrew Catholics may celebrate Passover, Rosh Hashana, Shavuot, etc. and they may even perform rituals like the wearing of kippot, tallitot, tefillin, the use of mezuzot and they may also keep many of the mitzvot (commandments) which are prescribed in the Torah as a sign of their heritage, just like Orthodox Jews. When these Jewish holidays and practices do not conflict with Catholic doctrine, they are kept for ethnic reasons, much as Irish Americans might celebrate Saint Patrick's Day as a major feast day, regardless of the diocese which they reside in, out of a sense of Hibernophilia as Irish Catholics. In passing, The Acts of the Apostles states that Saint Paul the Apostle celebrated the Jewish religious holidays based on his stated belief that it is good for Christians to obey the Mosaic Law in any way they wish in accordance with their faith (Acts 18:21; Acts 20:6; Acts 20:16; and in 1 Corinthians 16:8). Jesus Christ is also recorded to have observed the Jewish religious holidays during His Earthly ministry (Matthew 26:17; John 5:1; John 7:2; John 7:37; John 10:22; John 11:56; John 12:12; John 13:1; and John 13:29).

== History ==
The movement's associations include the Association of Hebrew Catholics (AHC), Remnant Of Israel (ROI) which was founded in 1976 by Father Arthur Klyber, and Miriam Bat Tzion. The AHC and the ROI are English-speaking organizations, and Miriam Bat Tzion is a French-speaking one. There is also a group of Spanish-speaking Hebrew Catholics in Venezuela and groups in other countries as well.

According to David Moss, the current president of the AHC, it was estimated to have around 10,000 members in 2000. The countries with the largest membership are the USA and Israel, but members are also found in Canada, France, Italy, Australia, Spain, England, Argentina, Brazil, Mexico, Venezuela, Colombia, Belgium, New Zealand, and Germany.

Hebrew Catholics should not be confused with Protestant Christians of Jewish origin that call themselves Messianic Jews, who are members of a variety of denominations, ranging from Anglican e.g. Christ Church, Jerusalem to independent Jewish Christian ones, many of which are Sabbatarian Protestant, and like some Hebrew Catholics, some of their members also celebrate Jewish holy days and emphasize Jewish elements within Christianity. Hebrew Catholics are in full communion with the Bishop of Rome and are not an independent movement, and they may be either liberal or traditionalist. While some form of corporate ecclesial and ritual identity had been raised by some Hebrew Catholics prior to 2009, Pope Benedict XVI's Apostolic Constitution Anglicanorum Coetibus prompted suggestions that personal ordinariates could also be appropriate for other groups, such as Hebrew or Jewish Catholics. This would allow for the preservation of Jewish identity within the Catholic Church and the restoration of the corporate life of the Jewish church in particular.

== Some halachic points of view ==
According to Bloomer in 2008, "There is a broad range of Jewish Catholics. From those who observe nothing much of the Jewish ways up to those who observe the same as Orthodox Jews. There are many different opinions but they all try to accept each other, whatever their level of observance."

Furthermore, David Neuhaus, patriarchal vicar for Hebrew-speaking Catholics in Jerusalem and himself a Jew by birth, declared in 2008 that "Dietary laws are not obligatory for those [Jews] who live in Christ. I would only understand dietary laws being observed by Jewish Hebrew Catholics if they had always practised these laws before becoming Catholic. It certainly does no harm. But adopting the laws as Catholics (or as secular Jews who have become Catholic) does not make much sense as we have the fullness of the promise in Jesus."

== In modern-day Israel ==
Since most Christians in Israel and the Palestinian territories are of Arab ethnicity, Christian clergy are mostly involved in community work with Israeli Arabs or with residents of the Palestinian territories, but rarely with Israeli Jews except Russian immigrants who have Jewish ancestry but consider themselves Christians. Israeli Arabs who belong to the Christian religion are recognized as such under Israeli law, but Jews who have converted are in most cases still registered as Jewish, because the State is very reluctant to recognize such conversions, even though there is no law against them. Some changes in attitude have taken place, as Israeli society is becoming more accustomed to the presence of a variety of religious denominations.

Another sensitivity is regarding Protestant Christians of Jewish origin who still regard themselves as practicing the same Judaism that other Jews practice – Messianic Jews – considered by both traditional Jews and traditional Christians to be a marginal movement. They do not consider themselves Catholic and are not considered as such by the Catholic Church.

A significant aspect in Jewish–Protestant and Jewish–Catholic relations in Israel is government policy. Ever since the foundation of the State of Israel in 1948, Judaism has been used in government policy and legislation as a means to give Israeli society a sense of identity. As a result, all matrimonial laws in Israel are religious, because no civil marriages can take place. Education is also segregated to a large degree between various religious denominations.

Animosity towards Catholics of Jewish origin was displayed in 1995, when Cardinal Jean-Marie Lustiger visited Israel and the Chief Rabbi Yisrael Meir Lau publicly accused him of betraying the Jewish people.

Vatican attitudes towards Israeli Catholics of Jewish origin have also shifted. From 1955, unofficial communities began celebrating the Mass in Hebrew with official Vatican endorsement.

The number of Israeli Catholics of non-Arab origin increased during the 1990s, due primarily to immigration from the former Soviet Union. As a result, the Vatican changed its policies in 2003, for the first time ordaining Jean-Baptiste Gourion as Auxiliary Bishop to overlook the Hebrew Catholic community in Israel. After Gourion's death Pierbattista Pizzaballa, the custos of the holy land at the time (Pizzaballa was appointed Latin Patriarch of Jerusalem in 2020 and a cardinal in 2023) became vicar.

The appointment of Fr. David Neuhaus as vicar upon Pizzaballa's resignation in 2008, however, is not in conformity with the importance that the Holy See ostensibly attributes to the newly emerging community. On the other hand, Neuhaus did participate in the Synod for Middle Eastern clergy as a special invitee of the Pope, and Hebrew – for the first time ever – was one of the official languages in which Radio Vatican covered the event.

From 2017 to 2021, Fr. Rafic Nahra (became bishop in 2022) was the patriarchal vicar for Hebrew-speaking Catholics.

Since August 2021, Fr. Piotr Zelazko has been the new vicar for Hebrew-speaking Catholics.
