= Pro-Cathedral of the Most Holy Name of Jesus =

Coordinates: 31°46′40″N 35°13′38″E

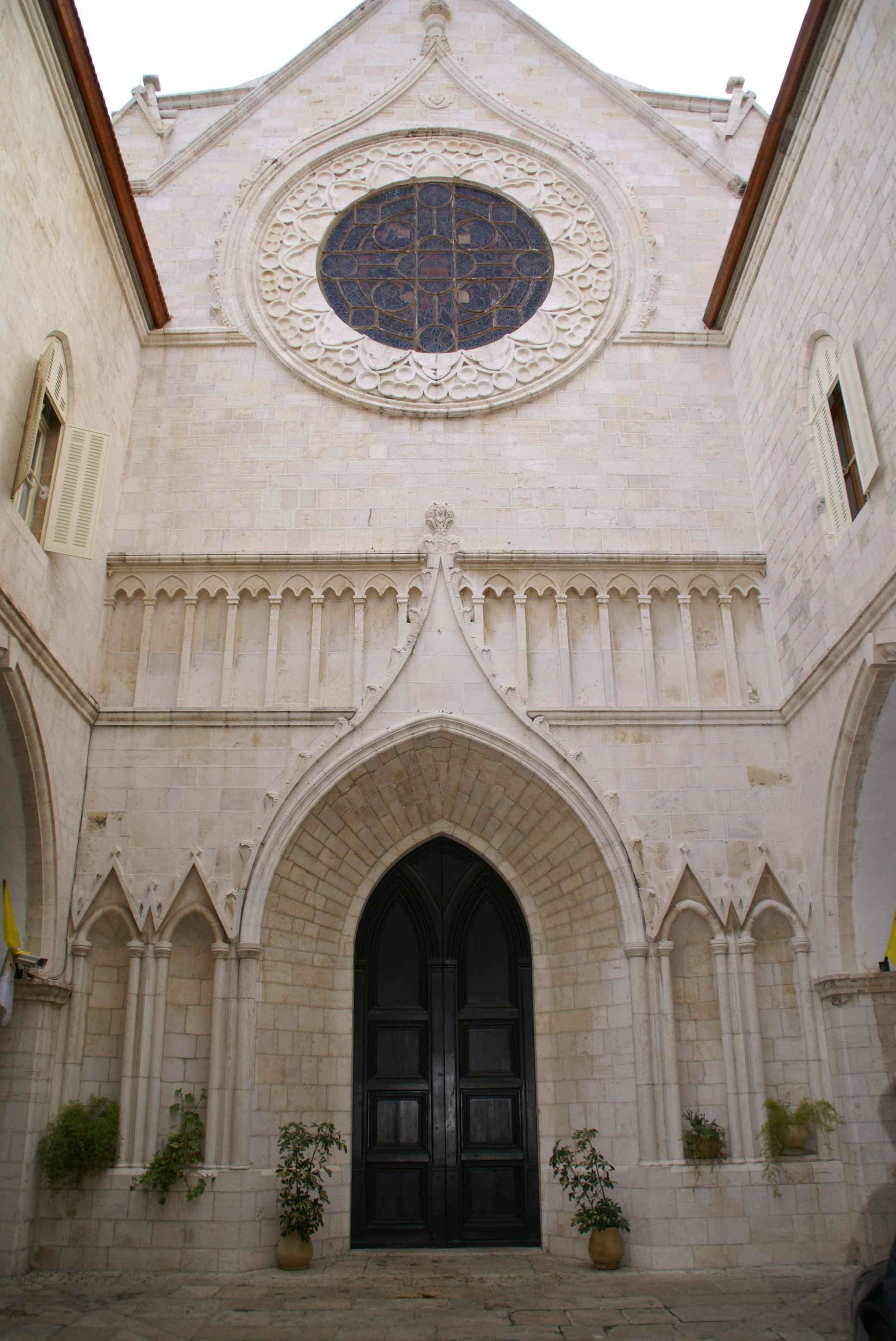
- Pro-Cathedral of the Most Holy Name of Jesus
- Location: Old City of Jerusalem
- Denomination: Catholic Church
- Sui iuris church: Latin Church

Architecture
- Style: Neo-Gothic
- Completed: 1872

The Pro-Cathedral of the Most Holy Name of Jesus, also known as the Holy Name of Jesus Pro-Cathedral, is the pro-cathedral, or technical cathedra of the Latin Patriarchate of Jerusalem. It is located in the Christian Quarter of the Old City of Jerusalem, about halfway between the New Gate and the Jaffa Gate, within the Old City walls.

== History ==
In 1847 the Ottoman Empire allowed the hierarchy of the Catholic Church to build a new cathedral in Palestine. The Co-Cathedral, completed in 1872, is part of the building complex of the Latin Patriarchate, effectively the bishop's church. For historical reasons, however, the Catholic Church has the Church of the Holy Sepulchre officially being the cathedral.

During the construction of the Pro-Cathedral, seat of the Latin Patriarch, its builders came upon remains of the solid masonry belonging to Jerusalem's old wall.

== Description ==
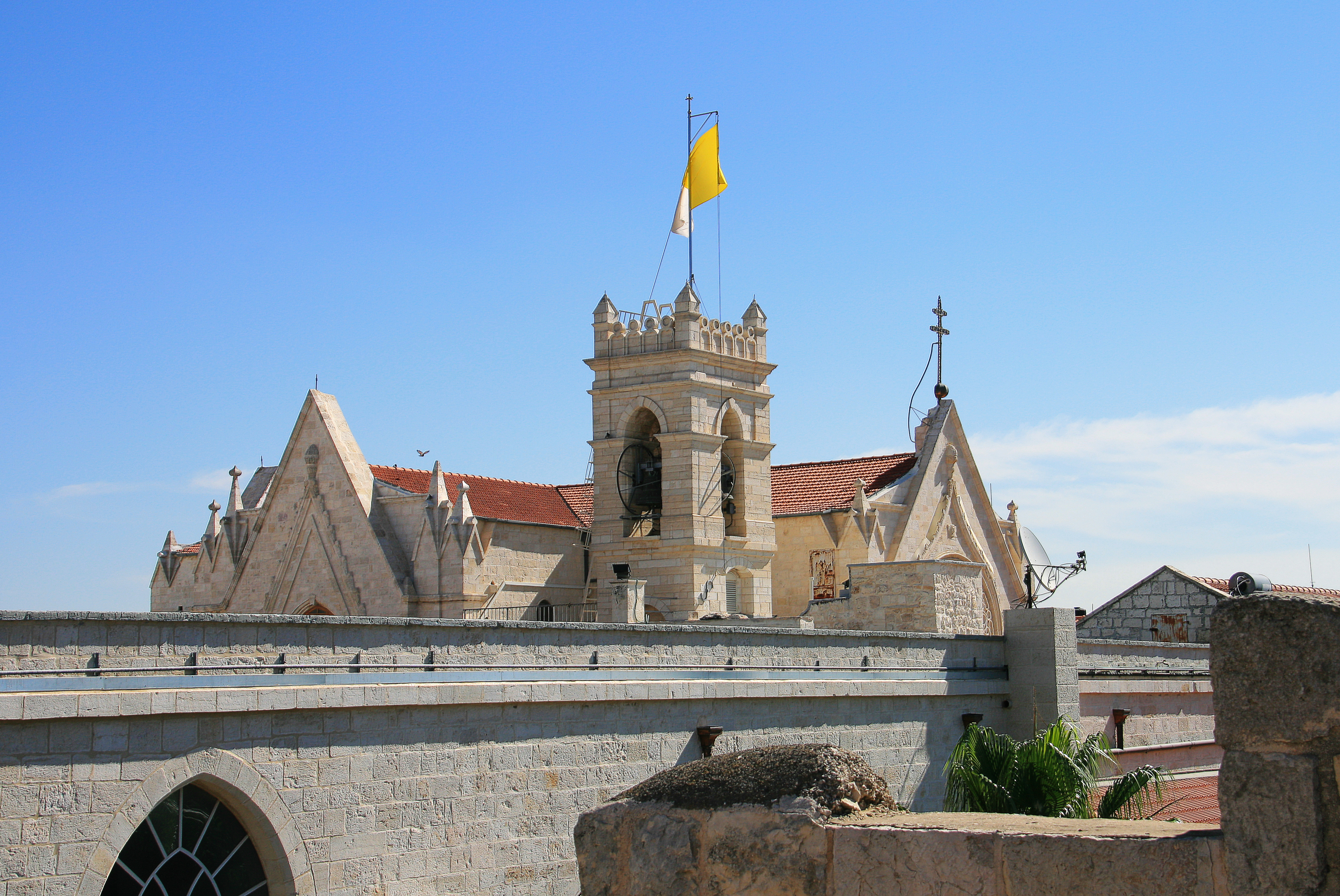
The pro-cathedral seen from the Ramparts Walk along the western city wall

In neo-Gothic style, the church has a floor plan of a Greek cross with a length of 28 meters and a width of 24 meters. The three-aisled church has an 8.5 metres wide nave, and the side aisles have a width of 4.5 metres; these are overbuilt with galleries. The church has four decorated stained glass windows, marking the ends of the cross. Three of them have the same shape: the window above the high altar represents the risen Christ as victor over death, the window on the left shows the Crucifixion, and the window on the right depicts the Adoration of the Magi. The rear window over the entrance is a large rose window and represents the Four Evangelists. The church has five altars, three in the nave and the two aisles and two smaller ones at the ends of the transept.

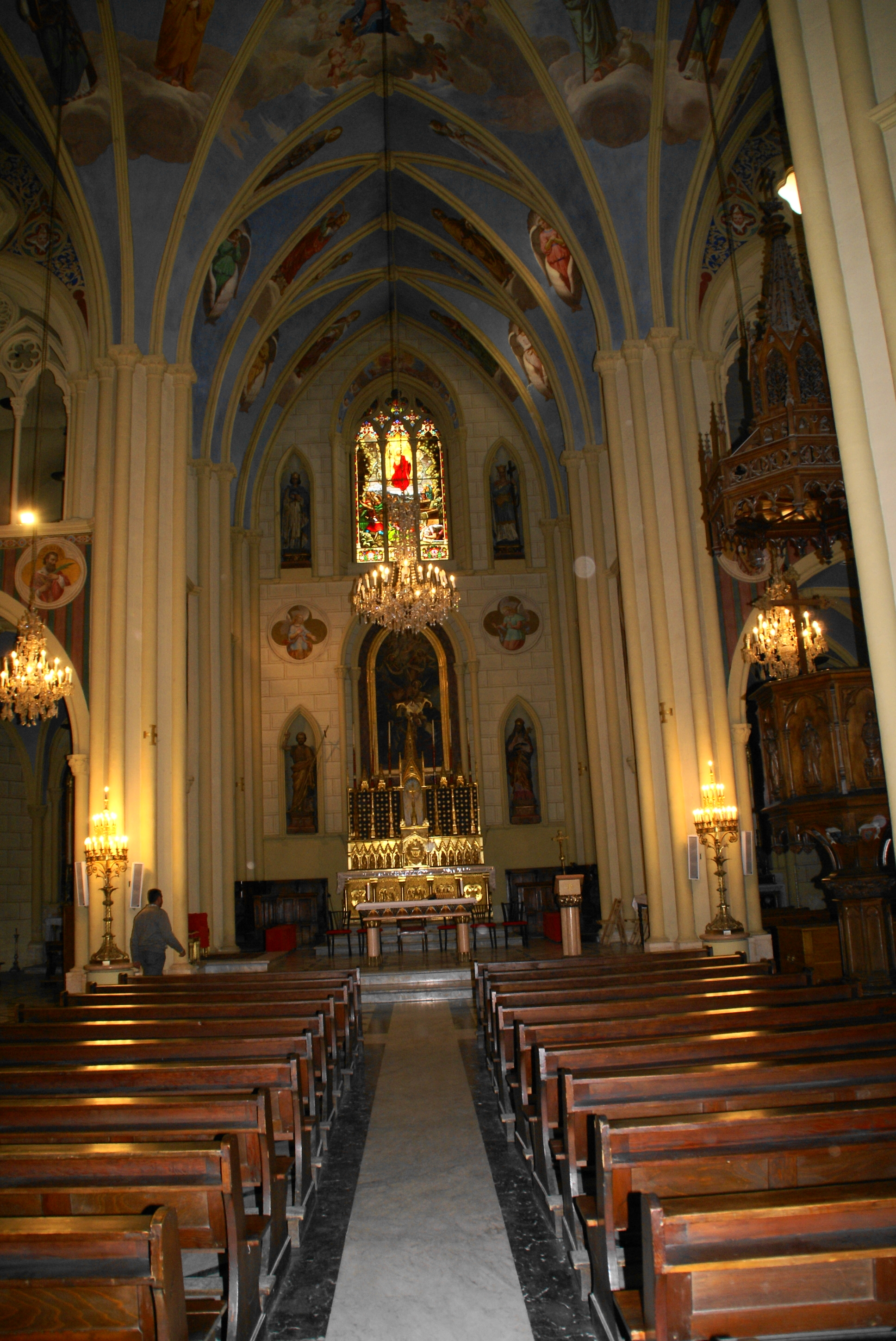
Inside view along the nave

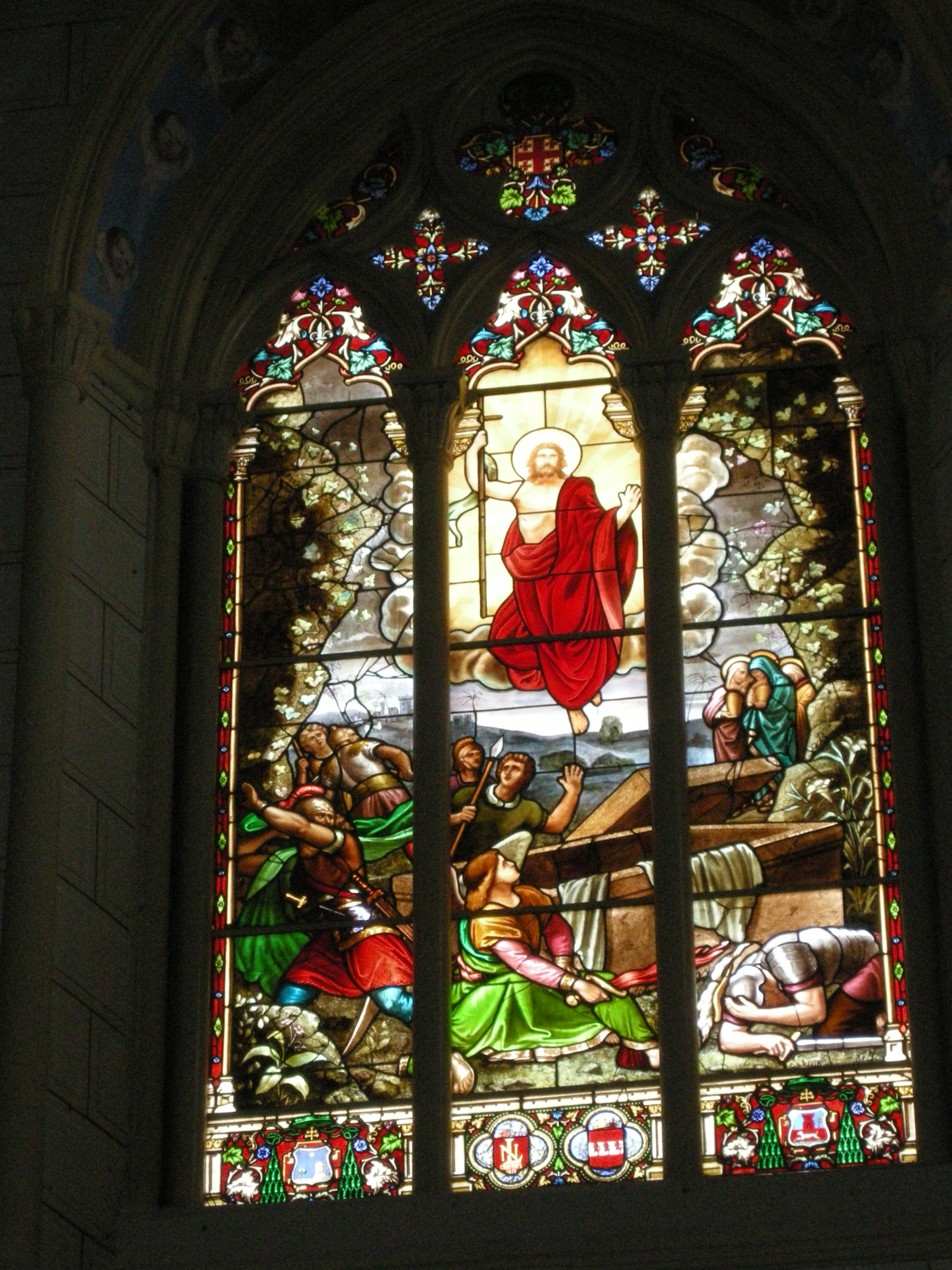
High altar window: The Resurrection

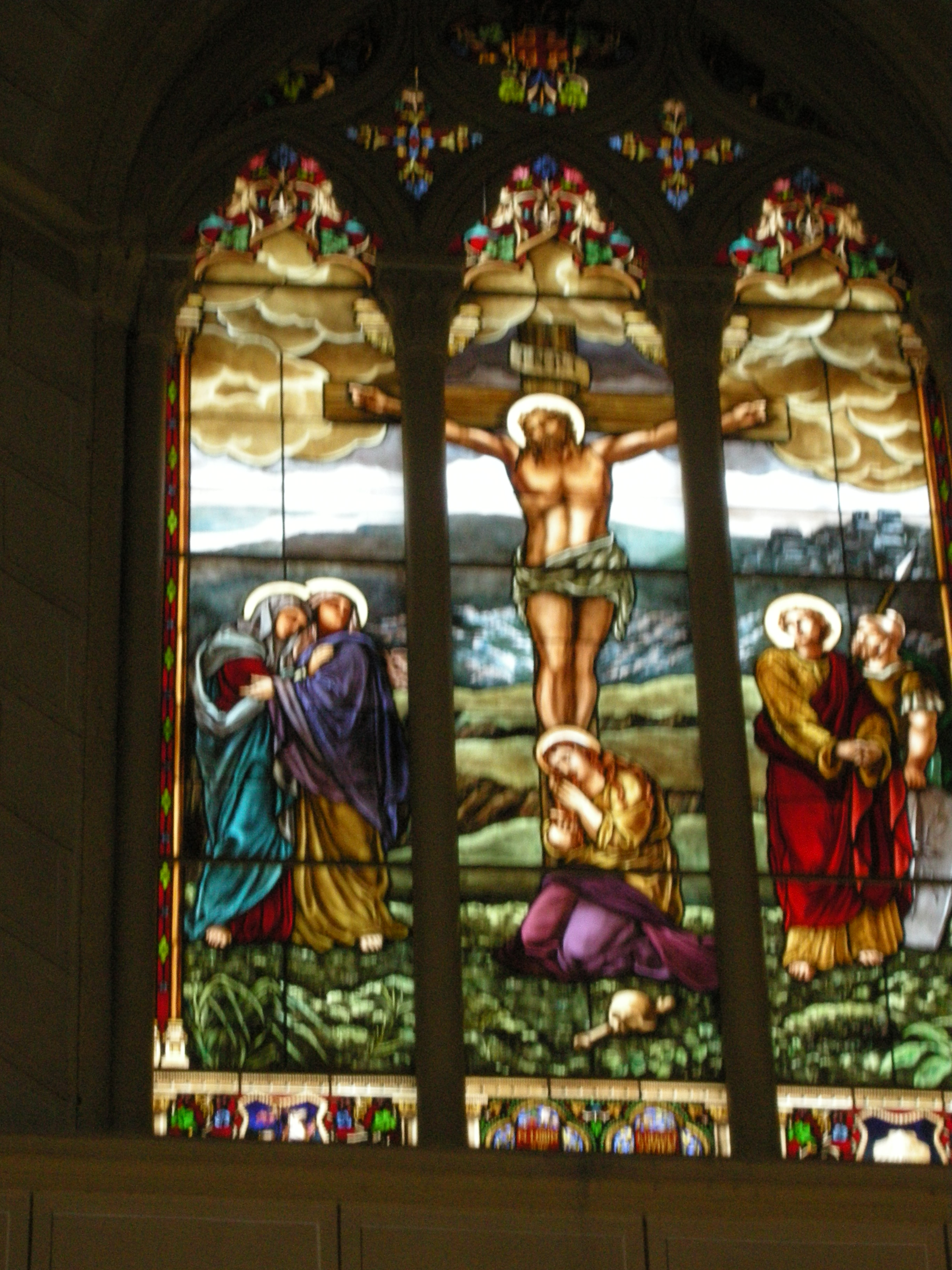
Left semitransept window: The Crucifixion

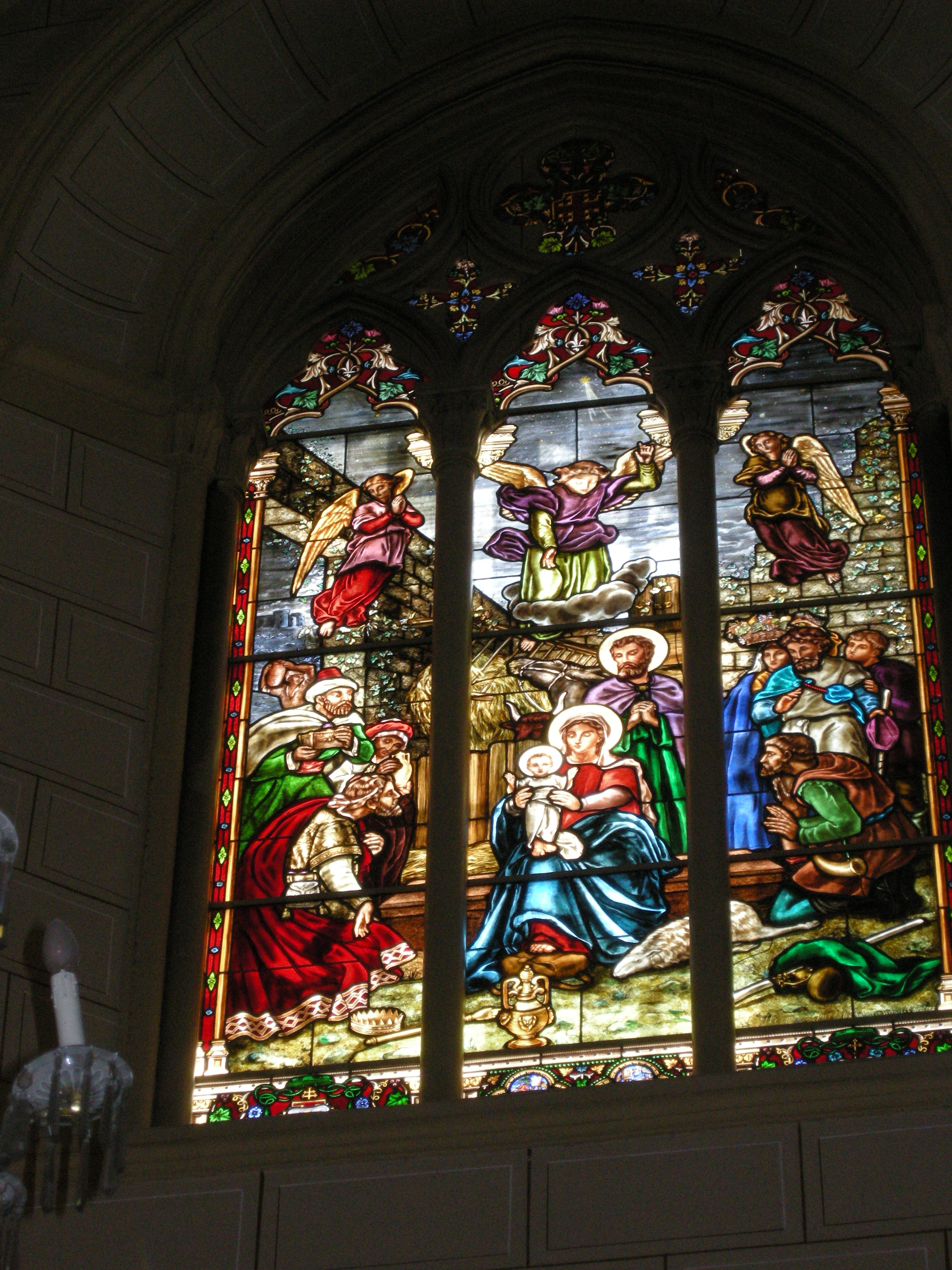
Right semitransept window: Adoration of the Three Magi
