= Giacomo Giuseppe Beltritti =

- Patriarch Emeritus of Jerusalem
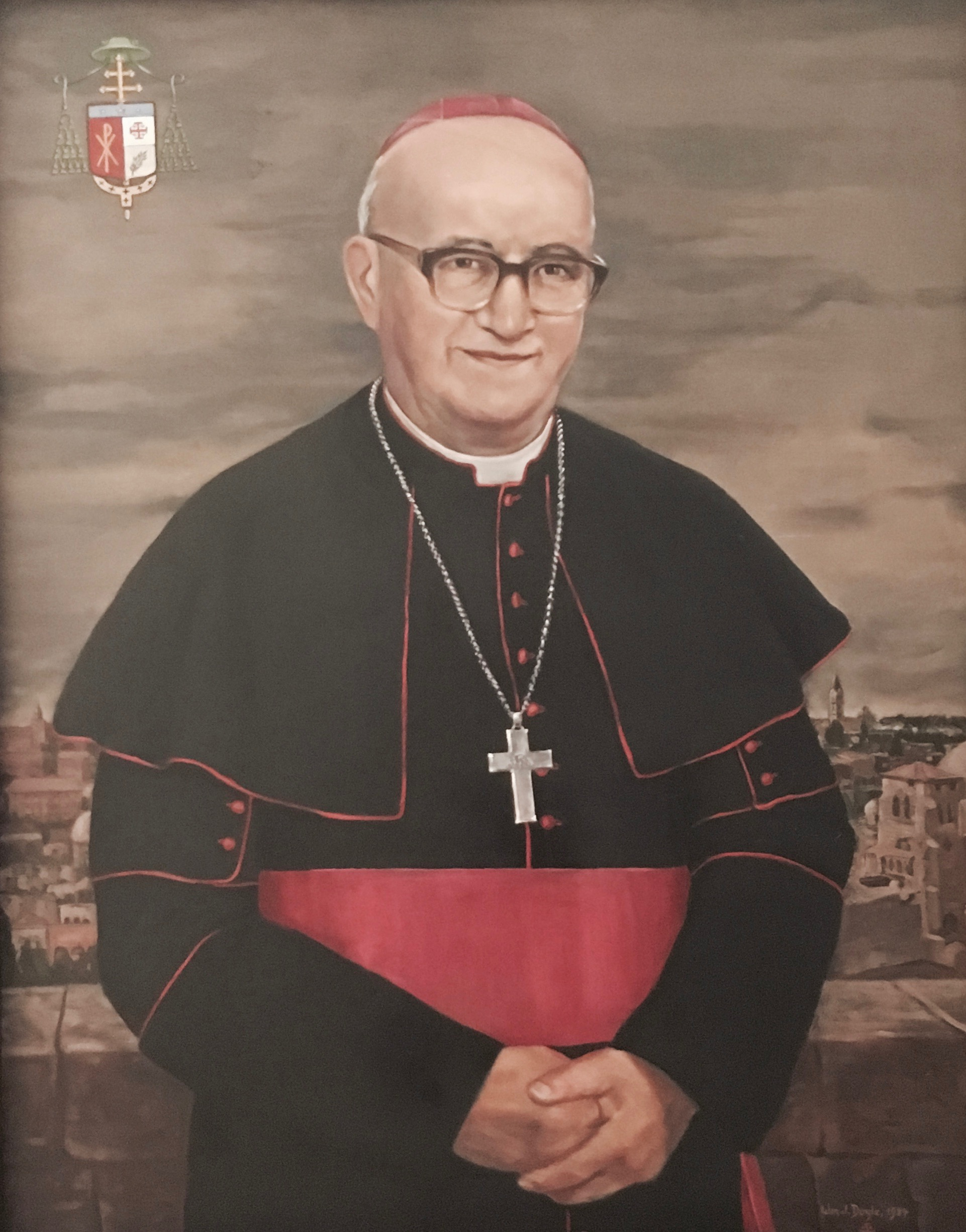
- Church: Roman Catholic Church
- See: Latin Patriarchate of Jerusalem
- Appointed: 25 November 1970
- Installed: 1970
- Retired: 11 December 1987
- Term ended: 1987
- Predecessor: Alberto Gori
- Successor: Michel Sabbah
- Previous posts: Coadjutor Patriarch of Jerusalem; Titular Bishop of Cana

Orders
- Ordination: 15 April 1933
- Consecration: 10 October 1965 by Patriarch Alberto Gori, O.F.M.
- Rank: Archbishop

Personal details
- Born: 23 December 1910 Peveragno, Piedmont, Italy
- Died: 1 November 1992 (aged 81) Jerusalem
- Education: Seminary in Beit Jala (West Bank)

Giacomo Giuseppe Beltritti (23 December 1910 – 1 November 1992) was an Italian prelate of the Roman Catholic Church. He served as Patriarch of Jerusalem from 1970 to 1987, the last non-Arab to hold this position until 2020.

Beltritti was born in Peveragno and came to the Holy Land in 1926, when he began studying for the priesthood at a seminary in Beit Jala in the West Bank. He was later ordained a priest on 15 April 1933. After the founding of Israel in 1948 and Israel's occupation of the West Bank in 1967, he helped Palestinians who became refugees.

On 21 September 1965, Beltritti was appointed Coadjutor Patriarch of Jerusalem and Titular Bishop of Cana by Pope Paul VI. He received his episcopal consecration on the following October 10 from Patriarch Alberto Gori, O.F.M., with Archbishop Mikhayl Assaf and Bishop Hanna Kaldany serving as co-consecrators.

He later succeeded Gori as Patriarch of Jerusalem on 25 November 1970. He served as head of the Catholic Church in Israel, the occupied West Bank and Gaza Strip, Jordan, and Cyprus for 17 years and, during that time, became known for his work in drawing young Palestinians into the priesthood and enlarging the Catholic school system.

Beltritti retired as Patriarch on 11 December 1987, and then taught catechism at the parochial school in Deir Rafat, where he resided at the local monastery. He later died in his sleep during a visit to Jerusalem, at age 81.

Catholic Church titles
| Preceded by Alberto Gori | Latin Patriarch of Jerusalem; 1970–1987 | Succeeded by Michel Sabbah |
