= Elias Friedman =

Catholic priest

Elias Friedman (March 11, 1916–June 11, 1999), was a Carmelite priest.

== Biography ==
He was born on March 11, 1916 in Capetown, South Africa. In 1943, he joined the Catholic Church. Four years later, he became a Discalced Carmelite. Friedman was ordained in 1953 and lived in the Stella Maris monastery on Mount Carmel in Haifa, Israel, from 1954 until his death in 1999. He founded the Association of Hebrew Catholics.

He wrote two books:

- Friedman, J. (1947) The Redemption of Israel. Sheed & Ward, London.
- Friedman, E. (1987) Jewish Identity. The Miriam Press. New York. ISBN 0-939409-003

== See also ==
- Carmelite Order
