= Siminina =

Africa Proconsularis (125 AD)

Siminina, was a Roman era civitas of the Roman province of Africa Proconsularis. The ancient city is tentatively identified with ruins at Bir-El-Djedidi, Tunisia.

The city was also the seat of an ancient Christian bishopric, suffragan of Archdiocese of Carthage. Only two bishops of Siminina are documented

- Deuterium was present at the Council of Carthage (484) called by the Vandal king Huneric.
- Giuniano intervened in the Council of Carthage (525).

Today Siminina survives as a titular bishopric.

From 17 December 2024, the titular bishop is Iyad Twal, auxiliary bishop of the Latin Patriarchate of Jerusalem.
