= Jean-Denis Gauthier =

French bishop in Vietnam

Jean-Denis Gauthier MEP
- Vicar Apostolic of Southern Tonking
- Church: Catholic Church
- See: Vicariate Apostolic of Southern Tonking
- In office: 27 March 1846 – 1 December 1877
- Predecessor: Vicariate established
- Successor: Yves-Marie Croc
- Other post: Titular Bishop of Emmaüs (1842-1877)
- Previous post: Coadjutor Vicar Apostolic of Southern Tonking (1839-1846)

Orders
- Ordination: 20 December 1834
- Consecration: 6 February 1842 by Pierre-André Retord

Personal details
- Born: 13 November 1810 Montaigu, Jura, French Empire
- Died: 1 December 1877 (aged 67)

Jean-Denis Gauthier (Montaigu 13 November 1810 – 1 December 1877) was a French bishop in Vietnam. He was a deacon at the seminary of the Missions-étrangères de Paris, left for Vietnam in 1835, was ordained there in 1842, and died at Nghi Diên (nôm: xã Đoài), Nghi Lộc District, Nghệ An Province in 1877.
