= James Laird Patterson =

Roman Catholic bishop

- Auxiliary Bishop of Westminster
- Church: Catholic Church
- Archdiocese: Archdiocese of Westminster
- In office: 30 April 1880 – 1 December 1902
- Other post: Titular Bishop of Emmaüs (1880-1902)

Orders
- Ordination: 1855 by Nicholas Wiseman
- Consecration: 9 May 1880 by Henry Edward Manning

Personal details
- Born: 16 November 1822 Marylebone, Middlesex, United Kingdom of Great Britain and Ireland
- Died: 1 December 1902 (aged 80) Chelsea, County of London, United Kingdom of Great Britain and Ireland

James Laird Patterson (16 November 1822 – 1 December 1902) was a British Catholic bishop and the titular Bishop of Emmaus.

Patterson was born in London in 1822, and was educated in Germany and at Trinity College, Oxford, where he took his MA degree. In 1850 he joined the Roman Catholic communion, and went to Rome to pursue ecclesiastical studies for several years. On his return to the United Kingdom, he was ordained at St Mary Moorfields, to which church he was appointed. He was also Master of Ceremonies to Cardinal Nicholas Wiseman, Archbishop of Westminster from 1850 until 1865, and represented the Cardinal in Rome during the forced retirement of Bishop George Errington in 1860.

After Wiseman's death in 1865, Patterson was appointed an honorary chamberlain to Pope Pius IX, and in 1870 he was appointed by Cardinal Manning to be President of St Edmund's College, Ware. He held this position for ten years, until early 1880 when he was consecrated Bishop to take up the see of Northampton. Ill-health prevented him from taking the position, and he stayed in London for the rest of his life, becoming Provost of the Westminster Cathedral Chapter and an auxiliary bishop in the diocese of Westminster.

He died at St. Mary's Rectory, Cadogan Street in London on 1 December 1902.
