= Alberto Gori =

Latin Patriarch of Jerusalem

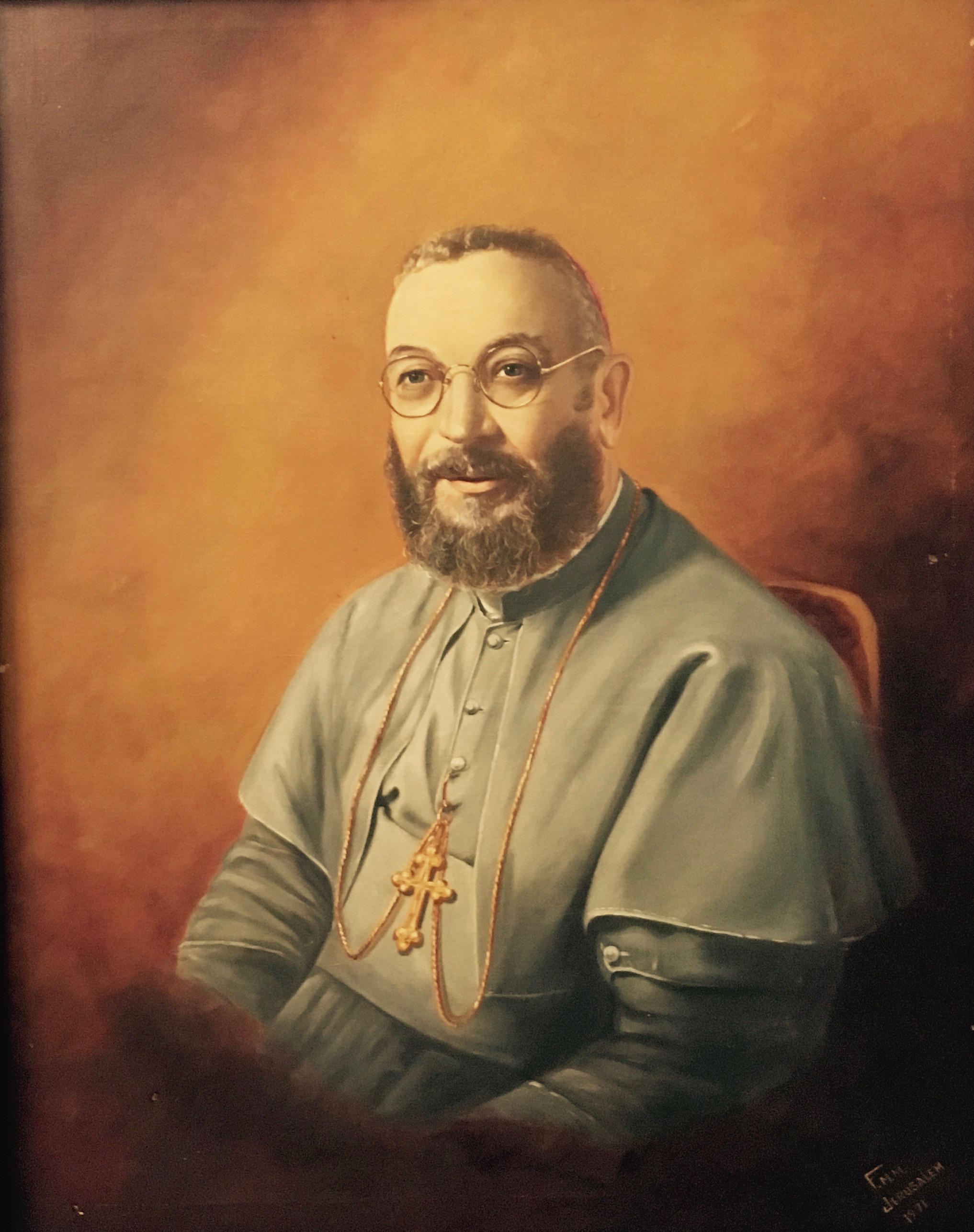

Alberto Gori, OFM (Arabic: ألبيرتو جوري; 9 February 1889 in San Piero Agliana, Italy – 25 November 1970 in Jerusalem, Israel) was a Latin Patriarch of Jerusalem and Custodian of the Holy Land.

== Biography ==
Alberto Gori was born in San Piero Agliana in the Province of Pistoia. He belonged to the Tuscan province of the Franciscan church of Saint Bonaventure. Gori was ordained on 19 July 1914 in San Miniato al Tedesco. During World War I he served in the Italian army. After the war he was sent by his superiors to Palestine, where he entered the service of the Custody of the Holy Land.

In the Holy Land, he worked at the Church of the Holy Sepulchre in Jerusalem, and then in Aleppo in Syria, as a school principal. In 1937 Gori was elected by the General Definitory Franciscan Order Custodian of the Holy Land. He held his office during World War II. The British mandate, who ruled over Palestine - did not remove him from office, although being Italian, it should be, as others of his countrymen, interned or expelled from the area of the Near East. Gori did not arouse any suspicion. As Custodian Gori rebuilt the shrines of the Visitation in Ein Karem (was immortalized in a fresco in the main altar) and the miracle of Resurrection at Nein. He accepted the offer of Custody land on the Mount of Beatitudes, Sea of Galilee and the surrounding Hittin hills. In 1937, he inaugurated the new Mosaic on Calvary at the Church of the Holy Sepulchre in Jerusalem. A year later he erected the building seminary on Mount Tabor. As Custodian Gori allowed to conduct archaeological excavations in Ein Karem (St. John in the wilderness), Emmaus (Arabic. El-Qubejbeh) and Al-Eizariya (Arabic. Lazari). Under his rule were established missions in Ink Zik (Ghassanieh) and Halluz in Syria, and was established the existence of mission work among the Copts in Egypt. Gori, being a curator, has served as a mediator in the Arab-Israeli conflict after World War II and sought the right to freedom of religion for Christians in the Israeli government. In 1947, he visited the Church of the Holy Sepulchre beside former Vice President Henry Wallace of the United States.

In 1949, Gori was elected Latin Patriarch of Jerusalem. He officially ingressed into Jerusalem on 18 February 1949. As patriarch he has created several new parishes (Beit Sahoor, Gaza, Nour, Irbed and Khirbeh). Gori also contributed to the development of the female congregation of the Sisters of the Rosary, building them up 8 new monasteries. He took part in the Second Vatican Council.

Patriarch Gori died on 25 November 1970 in Jerusalem. He was buried in the Chapel of St. Joseph in the basement of the Latin Patriarchate.

== Bibliography ==
- Basilio Talatinian OFM, I custodi di Terra Santa dal 1937 al 2004. Appendice agli Acta Custodiae Terrae Sanctae per la ricorrenza del 50º anniversario dell’edizione degli stessi ACTA (1956 - 2005), Jerusalem 2005, str. 3-20.
- Paolo Pieraccini, A biographical profile of Bishop Alberto Gori

Catholic Church titles
Preceded by Luigi Barlassina	Latin Patriarch of Jerusalem; 1949–1970	Succeeded by Giacomo Giuseppe Beltritti
