= Latin Patriarchate of Jerusalem =

Catholic episcopal see

Latin Patriarchate of Jerusalem Patriarchatus Latinus Hierosolymitanus: הפטריארכיה הלטינית של ירושלים; بطريركية القدس للاتين

catholic
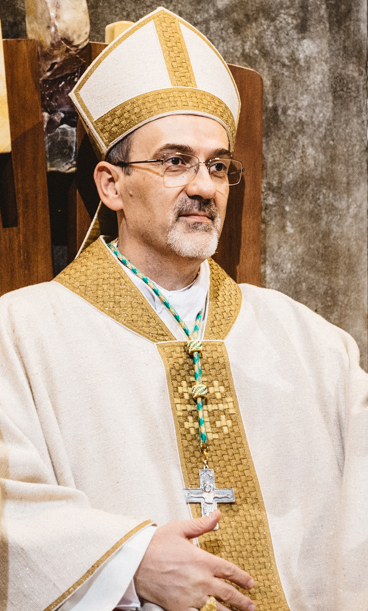
- Cardinal Pierbattista Pizzaballa, the current Latin Patriarch of Jerusalem

- Coat of arms

Location
- Country: Cyprus; Israel; Jordan; Palestine
- Ecclesiastical province: Immediately subject to the Holy See

Statistics
- Parishes: ▲69 (2022)
- Members: ▲368,426 (2022)

Information
- First holder: James the Just (As the first bishop of the See of Jerusalem); Arnulf of Chocques (As the first Latin patriarch of Jerusalem)
- Denomination: Catholic
- Sui iuris church: Latin Church
- Rite: Roman Rite
- Established: 33 A.D. (as the establishment of the See of Jerusalem); 1099 (as the establishment of the Latin patriarchate under the Holy See); 1374 (being a titular see); 23 July 1847 (re-establishment and current form)
- Cathedral: Church of the Holy Sepulchre
- Co-cathedral: Co-Cathedral of the Most Holy Name of Jesus
- Secular priests: ▲99 (diocesan) (2022); ▼391 (religious priests); ▼8 (permanent deacons)

Current leadership
- Pope: Leo XIV
- Patriarch: Pierbattista Pizzaballa
- Auxiliary Bishops: William Hanna Shomali; Rafic Nahra; Bruno Varriano; Iyad Twal
- Bishops emeritus: Michel Sabbah; Fouad Twal; Salim Sayegh; Giacinto-Boulos Marcuzzo; Maroun Elias Nimeh Lahham

Website
- www.lpj.org

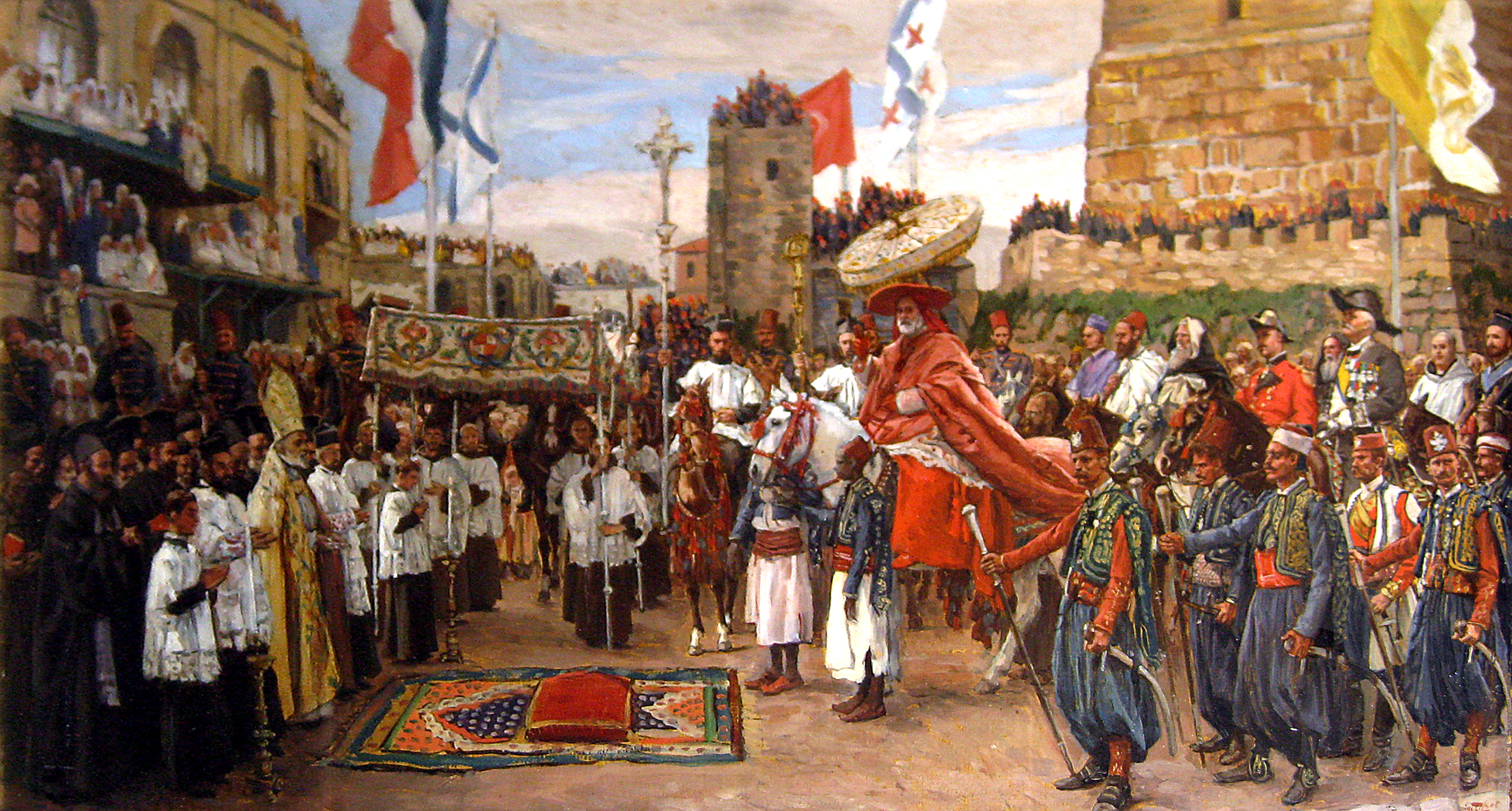
Entry of the Latin Patriarch in Jerusalem (from James Tissot)

The Latin Patriarchate of Jerusalem (Latin: Patriarchatus Latinus Hierosolymitanus) is the Latin Catholic ecclesiastical patriarchate in Jerusalem, officially seated in the Church of the Holy Sepulchre. The Latin patriarch of Jerusalem is the archbishop of Latin Church Catholics of the Archdiocese of Jerusalem with jurisdiction for all Latin Catholics in Israel, Palestine, Jordan and Cyprus; he also holds the office of grand prior of the Order of the Holy Sepulchre. It is exempt, being directly subject to the Holy See (and exceptionally its Dicastery for the Eastern Churches, which normally handles Eastern Catholics). It is not within an ecclesiastical province, and has no metropolitan functions.

The patriarchate was originally established in 1099, with the Kingdom of Jerusalem encompassing the territories in the Holy Land newly conquered by the First Crusade. From 1374 to 1847 it was a titular see, with the patriarchs of Jerusalem being based at the Basilica di San Lorenzo fuori le Mura in Rome. Pope Pius IX re-established a resident Latin patriarch in 1847.

The title of patriarch in the Latin Church is retained by only five archbishops: the patriarchs of Jerusalem, of the West (being the pope himself), of Venice, of Lisbon and of the East Indies. Until 1964, there had also been the honorary patriarchal titles of Constantinople, Alexandria and Antioch; still others were abolished earlier. Outside the Catholic Church, the title of "Patriarch of Jerusalem" is also used by the Greek Orthodox patriarch, the Armenian patriarch, and within the Catholic Church it is also used titularly by the Melkite patriarch.

== History ==
Jerusalem (in Latin also Hierosolyma) was one of the Apostles' original bishoprics (diocese). It was renamed Aelia Capitolina in 135 AD, again Jerusalem in 325. In 451 it was promoted as patriarchal see. After 649, Pope Martin I appointed John of Philadelphia (Amman) as patriarchal vicar of Jerusalem to replace Sergius of Jaffa.

In 1054, the Great Schism split Christianity into the Catholic Church, which consisted of the pope of Rome and virtually all of Western Christianity; and the Eastern Orthodox Church—which consisted of the four Orthodox Christian patriarchs of Antioch, Jerusalem, Constantinople and Alexandria—under the stewardship of Constantinople. Apart from the Maronites, most Christians in the Holy Land came under the jurisdiction of the Eastern Orthodox Patriarchate of Jerusalem.

=== Latin Kingdom of Jerusalem ===
In 1099, the Western crusaders captured Jerusalem, set up the Kingdom of Jerusalem and established a Latin hierarchy under a Latin patriarch (in communion with Rome), while expelling the Orthodox patriarch. The Latin Patriarchate was divided into four archdioceses—their heads bearing the titles of archbishop of Tyre, archbishop of Caesarea, archbishop of Nazareth and archbishop of Petra—and a number of suffragan dioceses. The Latin patriarch took over control of the Latin quarter of the city of Jerusalem (the Holy Sepulchre and the immediate surroundings) as his metropolitan see, and had as his direct suffragans the bishops of Lydda-Ramla, Bethlehem, Hebron and Gaza, and the abbots of the Temple, Mount Sion and the Mount of Olives.

The Latin patriarch resided in Jerusalem from 1099 to 1187, while Orthodox patriarchs continued to be appointed, but resided in Constantinople. In 1187, the crusaders were forced to flee Jerusalem, and the Latin Patriarchate moved to Acre (Akka), while the Orthodox patriarch returned to Jerusalem. The Catholic Church continued to appoint residential Latin patriarchs. The crusader Kingdom of Jerusalem endured almost 200 years until the last vestiges of the kingdom were conquered by the Muslim Mamluks in 1291, and the Latin hierarchy was effectively eliminated in the Levant.

With the fall of Acre, the Latin patriarch moved to the Kingdom of Cyprus in 1291.

=== Titular Latin Patriarchate of Jerusalem ===
In 1374, the Kingdom of Cyprus underwent a severe upheaval when it was invaded by the Genoese, who conquered Famagusta and held King Peter II captive.

From that time on, the Latin patriarchs of Jerusalem ceased to reside in Cyprus. The Catholic Church continued to appoint titular patriarchs of Jerusalem, but from then on they were based at the Basilica di San Lorenzo fuori le Mura in Rome.

In 1342, Pope Clement VI officially committed the care of the Holy Land to the Franciscans and the Franciscan Custos of the Holy Lands (the grand masters of the Order of the Holy Sepulchre) held the title ex officio under the papal bull Gratiam agimus by Clement VI, unless someone was specifically appointed to the honorary office.

In 1570, it gained territories from the suppressed Archdiocese of Nicosia and Diocese of Paphos, and in 1571 it gained more territories from the suppressed Diocese of Limassol and Diocese of Famagosta, all in former crusader Kingdom of Cyprus, which had fallen to the Ottoman Turks.

=== Modern Patriarchate of Jerusalem ===
A resident Latin patriarch was re-established in 1847 by Pius IX, with Bishop Joseph Valerga being appointed to the office. Though officially superseding the Franciscans, Valerga was also the grand master of the Order. On Valerga's death in 1872, Vincent Braco was appointed, and following his death in 1889, the Ottoman sultan authorised the re-establishment of a Latin hierarchy. The grand masters of the Order continued to be named as Latin patriarchs until 1905.

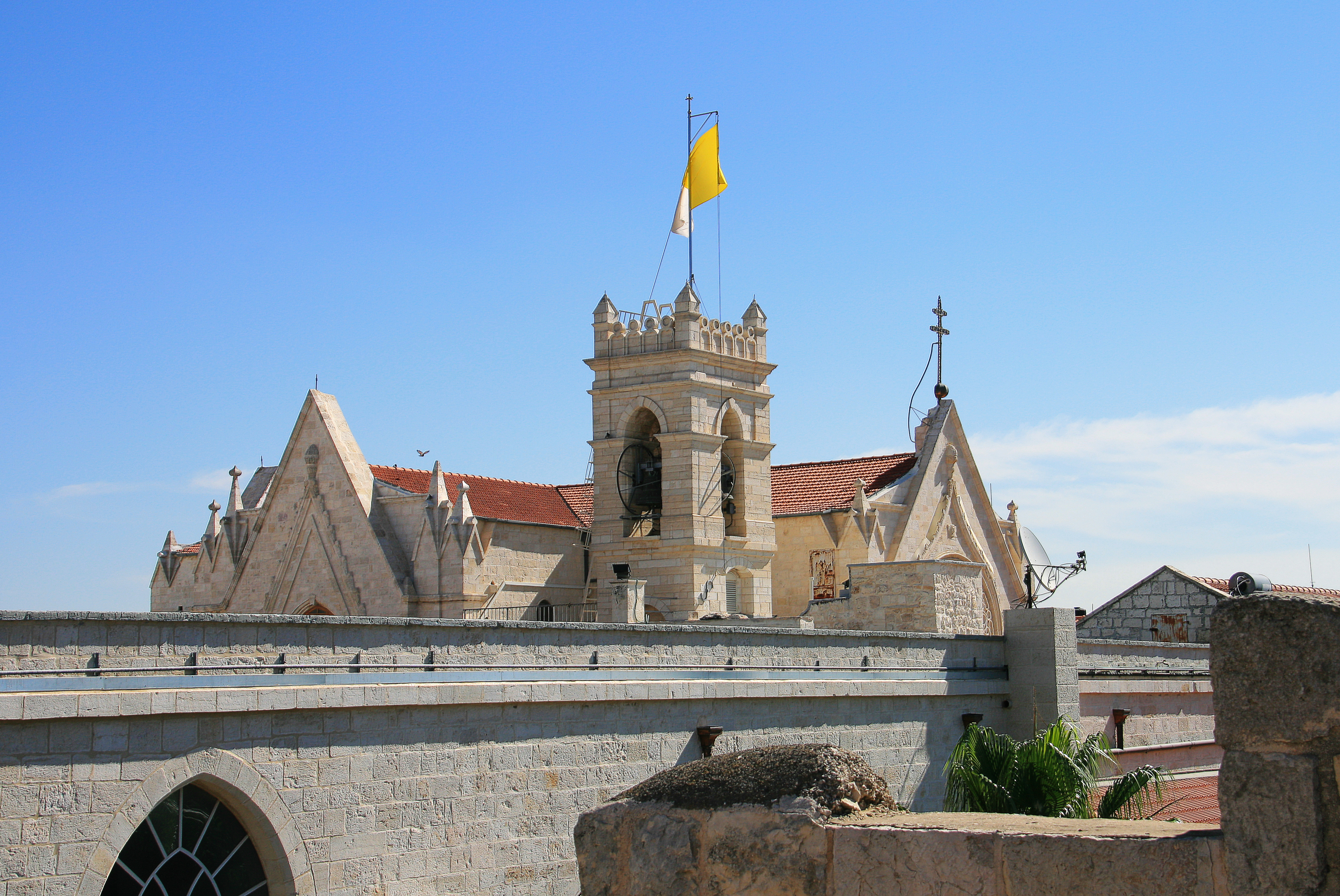
Church of the Most Holy Name of Jesus, the Patriarchate's co-cathedral, Jerusalem

The Co-Cathedral of the Most Holy Name of Jesus is the principal, or "mother" church of the Latin Patriarchate, the church in which the Latin patriarch of Jerusalem has his official chair (cathedra). However, the Basilica of the Holy Sepulchre has the title of cathedral of the patriarchate. The residence of the patriarch is in the Old City, near the Co-Cathedral, while the seminary, which is responsible for the liturgical education, is in Beit Jala, a town 10 km south of Jerusalem, where it has been since 1936.

In 1987, Michel Sabbah became the first native Palestinian to be appointed Latin patriarch. The Latin Patriarch of Jerusalem is now the diocesan archbishop of Latin Catholics of the Catholic Archdiocese of Jerusalem and has jurisdiction for all Latin Church Catholics in Israel, Palestine, Jordan and Cyprus.

The prerogatives of the patriarch in his relation with government authorities overlap with the prerogatives of the apostolic nuncio to Israel and the apostolic delegate to Jerusalem and Palestine.

In 2008, Archbishop Fouad Twal was appointed patriarch to succeed Michel Sabbah. He exercised his mandate from June 21, 2008, until June 24, 2016, when he reached the canonical age of retirement and Pope Francis accepted his resignation. On 24 June 2016, Pope Francis nominated Father Pierbattista Pizzaballa as Apostolic Administrator sede vacante of the patriarchate and appointed him titular archbishop of Verbe. On 24 October 2020, Archbishop Pizzaballa was elevated to the position of patriarch. He took possession of the see on 6 November 2020.

Pope Paul VI visited in January 1964, Pope John Paul II in March 2000, Pope Benedict XVI in May 2009 and Pope Francis in May 2014.

== Organisation and territory ==
The patriarch is supported by bishops and non-bishop patriarchal vicars:

- William Shomali, Auxiliary Bishop and Vicar General of Latin Patriarchate, and Patriarchal Vicar for Jerusalem and Palestine
- Rafic Nahra, Auxiliary Bishop and Patriarchal Vicar for Israel, based in Nazareth
- Bruno Varriano, OFM, Auxiliary Bishop and Patriarchal Vicar for Cyprus, based in Nicosia
- Iyad Twal, Auxiliary Bishop-elect and Patriarchal Vicar for Jordan, based in Amman
- Piotr Zelazko, Patriarchal Vicar for the Hebrew-speaking Catholics, based in Jerusalem
- Matthew Coutinho, SDB, Patriarchal Vicar for the migrants and asylum seekers of the Latin Patriarchate of Jerusalem, based in Tel Aviv

== Statistics and extent ==
As per 2015, it pastorally served 293,053 Catholics in 66 parishes with 464 priests (81 diocesan, 383 religious), 9 deacons, 1,652 lay religious (590 brothers, 1,062 sisters) and 55 seminarians. Since then, several parishes have been added and there are now over 70 across four areas in 2023.

The proper archdiocese of the patriarchal see of Jerusalem has jurisdiction over all Latin Catholics (not Eastern Catholics) in the Holy Land (Israel, Palestine and Jordan) as well as Cyprus. In Jerusalem, the Latin Catholic community is the largest Christian community, with some 4,500 people out of an estimated Christian population of about 11,000.

== Special churches ==
In Jerusalem, the patriarch has his cathedral archiepiscopal see, a minor basilica and World Heritage Site: the Basilica of the Holy Sepulchre, as well as the Co-Cathedral, also a World Heritage Site: Co-Cathedral of the Most Holy Name of Jesus, and four other Minor Basilicas and World Heritage Sites: Basilica of the Agony, Basilica of St. Stephen, Dormition Abbey of the Virgin Mary and St. Anne's Church.

Other cities in the archdiocese have more minor basilicas: Basilica of the Annunciation in Nazareth, Basilica of the Transfiguration in Mount Tabor, Carmelite Monastery of Stella Maris in Haifa and St. Cleophas Church in El Qubeibeh, and two other World Heritage Sites, both in Bethlehem: Church of St. Catherine and Church of the Nativity.

== List of Latin patriarchs of Jerusalem ==
Prior to the Great Schism, there were no separate Latin and Greek Orthodox Churches, and thus no separate patriarchs. For patriarchs of Jerusalem of the unified Church prior to the Schism, see Greek Orthodox Patriarch of Jerusalem.

- Arnulf of Chocques (1099)
- Dagobert of Pisa (1099–1101)
  - Maurice of Porto (1101–1102), ad interim
- Evremar (1102–1105)
- Dagobert of Pisa (restored) (1105)
- Ghibbelin of Arles (1107–1112)
- Arnulf of Chocques (re-appointed) (1112–1118)
- Warmund of Picquigny (1119–1128)
- Stephen of La Ferté (1128–1130)
- William of Malines (1130–1145)
- Fulk of Angoulême (1146–1157)
- Amalric of Nesle (1157–1180)
- Heraclius (1180–1191)

Jerusalem itself was lost in 1187; seat of the patriarch moved (with the kingdom in retreat) to Acre

- Aymar the Monk (also known as Aimaro Monaco dei Corbizzi) (1194–1202)
- Soffred (also known as Loffredo Errico Gaetani) (1202–1204)
- Albert of Vercelli (also known as Albert Avogadro) (1204–1214)
- Ralph of Mérencourt (1214–1225)
- Gerold of Lausanne (1225–1238)
  - vacant (1238–1240); James of Vitry appointed but never served
- Robert of Nantes (1240–1254)
- James Pantaleon (1255–1261), future Pope Urban IV of Rome
- William II of Agen (1261–1270)
- Thomas Agni da Lentini (1271–1277)
- John of Vercelli (1278–1279)
- Elias of Périgueux (1279–1287)
- Nicholas of Hanapes (1288–1291)

Acre lost in 1291; see in exile moved to Cyprus and became titular

- Landolfo (1295–1304)
- Antony Bek (1306–1311), also Prince-Bishop of Durham in England from 1284 to 1310
- Pierre Pleinecassagne (1314–1318)
- Pierre (1314–1318)

The Franciscan Custodian of the Holy Land held the title from 1342 to 1830 under the Papal bull Gratiam agimus by Pope Clement VI. The bull declared the Franciscans as the official custodians of the Holy Places in the name of the Catholic Church, "unless someone was specifically appointed in the honorary office".

- Raymond Bequin (Raimondo Beguin), O.P. (1324–1329 Died)
- Peter Paludanus (Pierre de Palude or Pietro de la Palude), O.P. (1329–1342 Died)
- Élie de Nabinal, O.F.M. (1342)
- Pierre de Casa, O. Carm. (1342–1348)
- Emanuele de Nabinal, O.F.M. (1345)

Moved to Rome after 1374

- Guillaume Amici (Lamy) (1349–1360)
- Philippe de Cabassole (1361–1368)
- Guglielmo Militis, O.P. (1369–1371)
- Guilherme Audibert de la Garde (1371–1374)
- Philippe d'Alençon de Valois (1375–1378)
- Guglielmo da Urbino, O.F.M. (1379–?)

During the Western Schism, the patriarch was appointed by both popes resulting in overlapping appointments.

- Named by the pope in Rome:
  - Stephanus de Insula (Štefan), O.E.S.A. (1379–1384)
  - Fernandus (1386–1395)
  - Ugo Roberti (1396–1409 Died)
- Named by the Pope in Avignon:
  - Lope Fernández de Luna (1380–1382)
  - Bertrande de Chanac (1382–1385)
  - Aimone Séchal (1385–1404)
  - Francesc Eiximenis (Francesco Eximini), O.F.M. (1408–1409)
- Francisco Clemente Pérez Capera (1419–1429)
- Leonardo Delfino (patriarch), O.F.M. (1430–1434)
- Biagio Molino (1434–1447 Died)
  - Cristoforo Garatoni (Apostolic Administrator 1448–1449)
  - Bessarion (Apostolic Administrator 1449–1458)
- Lorenzo Zanni (Lorenzo Zane) (1458–1460)
- Louis de Haricuria (1460–1479)
- Bartolomeo della Rovere, O.F.M. (1480–1494)
- Giovanni Antonio Sangiorgio (1500–1503)
- Bernardino López de Carvajal y Sande (1503–1511 Resigned)

...

- Rodrigo de Carvajal (1523–1539)
- Alessandro Farnese (1539–1550)
- Cristoforo Spiriti (1550–1556 Died)
- Antonio Elio (Antonius Helius) (1558–1576)
- Gian Antonio Facchinetti de Nuce (1576–1584), future Pope Innocent IX of Rome
- Scipione Gonzaga (1585–1588)
- Fabio Blondus de Montealto (Fabio Biondi) (1588–1618)
- Francesco Cennini de' Salamandri (1618–1621)
- Diofebo Farnese (1621–1622 Died)
- Alfonso Manzanedo de Quiñones (1622–1627 Died)
- Domenico de' Marini (patriarch) (1627–1635 Died)
- Giovanni Battista Colonna (1636–1637 Died)
- Tegrimus Tegrimi (1638–1641 Died)
- Aegidius Ursinus de Vivere (1641–1647 Died)
  - unknown
- Camillo Massimo (1653–1671)
- Egidio Colonna (patriarch), O.S.B. (1671–1686 Died)
- Bandino Panciatichi (1689–1690)
- Niccolo Pietro Bargellini (1690–1694 Died)
- Francesco Martelli (1698–1706)
- Muzio Gaeta (1708–1728)
- Vincent Louis Gotti (1728–1729)
- Pompeo Aldrovandi (1729–1734)
- Tommaso Cervini (1734–1751)
- Tommaso Moncada La Rocca (1751–1762)
- Giorgio Maria Lascaris (1762–1795)
  - vacant (1795–1800)
- Michele di Pietro (1800–1821)
- Francesco Maria Fenzi (1816–1829)
- Paolo Augusto Foscolo (1830–1847), later Latin Patriarch of Alexandria, 1847–1860

Restoration of resident Latin patriarchs of Jerusalem in 1847

- Joseph Valerga (1847–1872)
- Giovanni Vincenzo Bracco (1872–1889)

Latin patriarchate hierarchy re-established in 1889

- Luigi Piavi (1889–1905)
  - Auxiliary Bishop: Pasquale Appodia (February 13, 1891 – November 7, 1901)

- vacant (1905–1906)

- Filippo Camassei (1906–1919)
- Luigi Barlassina (1920–1947)
  - Auxiliary Bishop: Godric Kean (July 14, 1924 – December 1928)
  - Auxiliary Bishop: Francesco Fellinger (February 26, 1929 – July 22, 1940)

- vacant (1947–1949)
- Auxiliary Bishop: Vincent Gelat (April 30, 1948 – January 19, 1968)

- Alberto Gori (1949–1970)
  - Vicar general: Bishop Pier Giorgio Chiappero, O.F.M. (August 31, 1959 – July 15, 1963)
  - Auxiliary Bishop: Hanna Kaldany (January 4, 1964 – May 14, 1996)
  - Auxiliary Bishop: Neemeh Simaan (September 21, 1965 – May 25, 1981)
- Giacomo Giuseppe Beltritti (1970–1987)
  - Auxiliary Bishop: Salim Sayegh (November 26, 1981 – January 19, 2012)
- Michel Sabbah (1987–2008)
  - Auxiliary Bishop: Kamal Hanna Bathish (April 29, 1993 – June 9, 2007)
- Fouad Twal (2008–2016)
  - Auxiliary Bishop: Giacinto-Boulos Marcuzzo, titular bishop of Emmaus (April 29, 1993 – August 29, 2020)
  - Auxiliary Bishop: William Hanna Shomali, titular bishop of Lydda (March 31, 2010 – present)

- vacant (June 24, 2016 – November 6, 2020)

- Pierbattista Pizzaballa (November 6, 2020 – present)
  - Auxiliary Bishop: Jamal Khader Daibes, titular bishop of Patara (March 11, 2022 – January 13, 2024), later Bishop of Djibouti
  - Auxiliary Bishop: Rafic Nahra, titular bishop of Verbe (March 11, 2022 – present)
  - Auxiliary Bishop: Bruno Varriano, titular bishop of Astigi (January 9, 2024 – present)
  - Auxiliary Bishop: Iyad Twal, titular bishop of Siminina (December 17, 2024 – present)

== See also ==
- Catholic Church in Israel
- Catholic Church in Palestine
- Catholic Church in the Middle East
- List of Catholic dioceses in the Holy Land and Cyprus
- List of parishes of the Latin Patriarchate of Jerusalem
- Our Lady of Palestine
- Custody of the Holy Land
- Latin Church in the Middle East
- Syriac Orthodox Bishop of Jerusalem, competing title

== Sources and external links ==
- Official website
- Saint James Vicariate for Hebrew-Speaking Catholics
- Listing Latin Patriarchs of Jerusalem at GCatholic.org
- Patriarchate of Jerusalem {Gerusalemme} at the Catholic Hierarchy website
- Homily of John Paul II in the Church of the Holy Sepulchre
