= Salim Sayegh (Catholic bishop) =

Salim Sayegh (born 15 March 1935 in Rumaimin, Jordan) is a Jordanian Catholic prelate who served as a patriarchal vicar for Jordan in the Latin Patriarch of Jerusalem from 1981 to 2012.

== Career ==
Salim Sayegh received on 28 June 1959 his ordination to priesthood. He was named by Pope John Paul II in 1981 Titular Bishop of Aquae in Proconsulari and appointed an auxiliary in the Latin Patriarchate of Jerusalem. His episcopal ordination occurred on January 6, 1982 by Pope John Paul II, with the co-consecrators being the Archbishop Eduardo Martínez Somalo and the Archbishop of São Salvador da Bahia Lucas Moreira Neves.

As auxiliary bishop in the Latin Patriarchate of Jerusalem, Sayegh was also Patriarchal Vicar for Jordan with his see being in Amman. In 2012, Sayegh retired as bishop at the mandatory age of 75.
