= Michel Sabbah =

Palestinian Catholic prelate (born 1933)

His Beatitude: Michel Sabbah; ميشيل صباح
- Patriarch Emeritus of Jerusalem
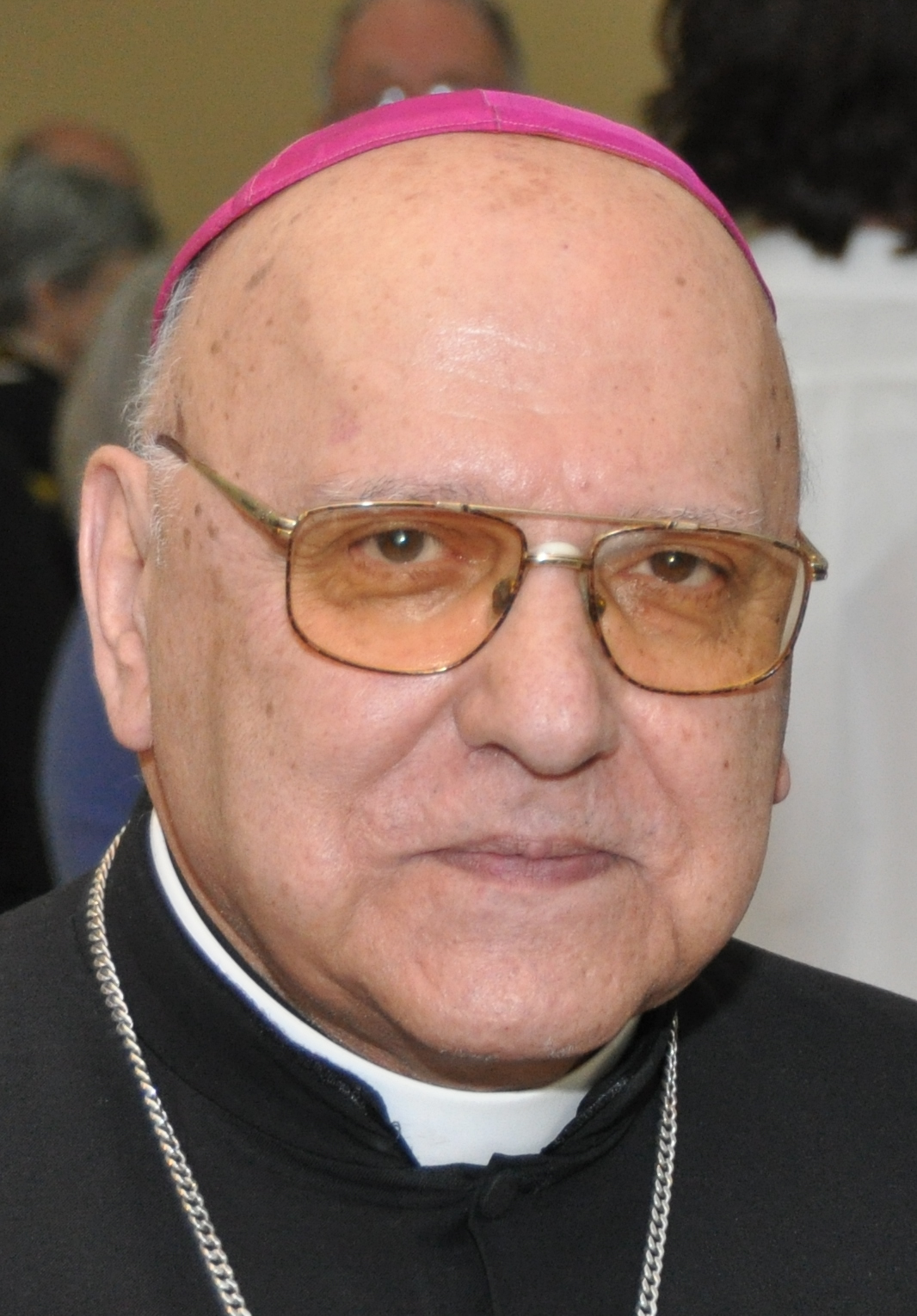
- Archdiocese: Jerusalem
- See: Jerusalem
- Appointed: 11 December 1987
- Installed: 6 January 1988
- Term ended: 21 June 2008
- Predecessor: Giacomo Giuseppe Beltritti
- Successor: Fouad Boutros Twal

Orders
- Ordination: 29 June 1955 by Alberto Gori
- Consecration: 6 January 1988 by Pope John Paul II

Personal details
- Born: 19 March 1933 (age 93) Nazareth
- Denomination: Roman Catholic

Styles of Patriarch Michael Sabbah
- Reference style: His Beatitude
- Spoken style: Your Beatitude
- Religious style: Monsignor
- Posthumous style: n/a

Michel Sabbah (Arabic: ميشيل صباح; born 19 March 1933) is a Palestinian Catholic prelate who served as the Latin Patriarch of Jerusalem from 1987 to 2008, the first non-Italian to hold the position in more than five centuries. He is one of relatively few Christian prelates in the Middle East to have referred to Israeli actions in the Gaza war as a genocide.

== Biography ==
Sabbah was born in Nazareth, Mandatory Palestine (currently Israel). He began his priestly studies at the Latin Patriarchal Seminary of Beit Jala in October 1949 and was ordained a priest for the Latin Patriarchate of Jerusalem in June 1955.

=== Priesthood ===
He was a parish priest for a few years before being sent to the University of St. Joseph in Beirut, Lebanon, to study Arabic language and literature. Shortly thereafter, he became director of schools for the Latin Patriarchate. He served in that position until the Arab-Israeli war in 1967. Sabbah then moved to Djibouti to teach Arabic and Islamic studies until 1973, when he began doctoral studies in Arabic philology at the Sorbonne. In 1980, he was named President of the Bethlehem University.

==== Patriarch ====
In 1987, Pope John Paul II appointed him Latin Patriarch of Jerusalem, making him the first native Palestinian to hold the office in centuries, although there had been calls for a Palestinian patriarch since the 1950s. When in 1998 the Pope named two cardinals in pectore, (Note: The in pectore cardinals were in John Paul's 2001 consistory revealed as Marian Jaworski and Jānis Pujāts.) Margaret Hebblethwaite suspected Sabbah might have been one of them, saying that

...[Sabbah's] nomination might have upset Israel

Other sources, though, never believed either of the in pectore cardinals to be Sabbah, and in 2001 it would be revealed he was not one of them.

From 1999 to 2007, Sabbah was the International President of Pax Christi, a Catholic organisation promoting peace.

==== Retirement ====
Sabbah resigned as Patriarch on 19 March 2008, after reaching the age of 75, the age of retirement. Sabbah served as the Grand Prior of the chivalric Equestrian Order of the Holy Sepulchre of Jerusalem, one of the knightly orders founded in 1099. On 11 December 2009, Sabbah together with other prominent Palestinian Christian leaders launched the Kairos Palestine Document against Israeli occupation.

In August 2025, Sabbah signed onto a statement from Jerusalem Voice for Justice, of which he is a member, that referred to the Gaza war as a genocide and said it could spread to other parts of Palestine.

== Honours ==
- Knight of the Collar of the Order of the Holy Sepulchre (Catholic) (Equestrian Order of the Holy Sepulchre of Jerusalem).
- Grand Officer of the Legion of Honour (France).
- Star of the Order of Jerusalem (Palestine).

== See also ==
- Palestinian Christians
- Latin Patriarchate of Jerusalem
- Christianity in Israel

== Notes ==
Catholic Church titles
Preceded by Giacomo Giuseppi Beltritti	Latin Patriarch of Jerusalem; 1987–2008	Succeeded by Fouad Twal
Preceded by Godfried Daneels	International President of Pax Christi; 1999–2007	Succeeded by Laurent Monsengwo Pasinya
