= Giacinto-Boulos Marcuzzo =

20th and 21st-century Catholic Italian bishop

His Excellency Giacinto-Boulos Marcuzzo
- Titular Bishop of Emmaus-Nicopolis
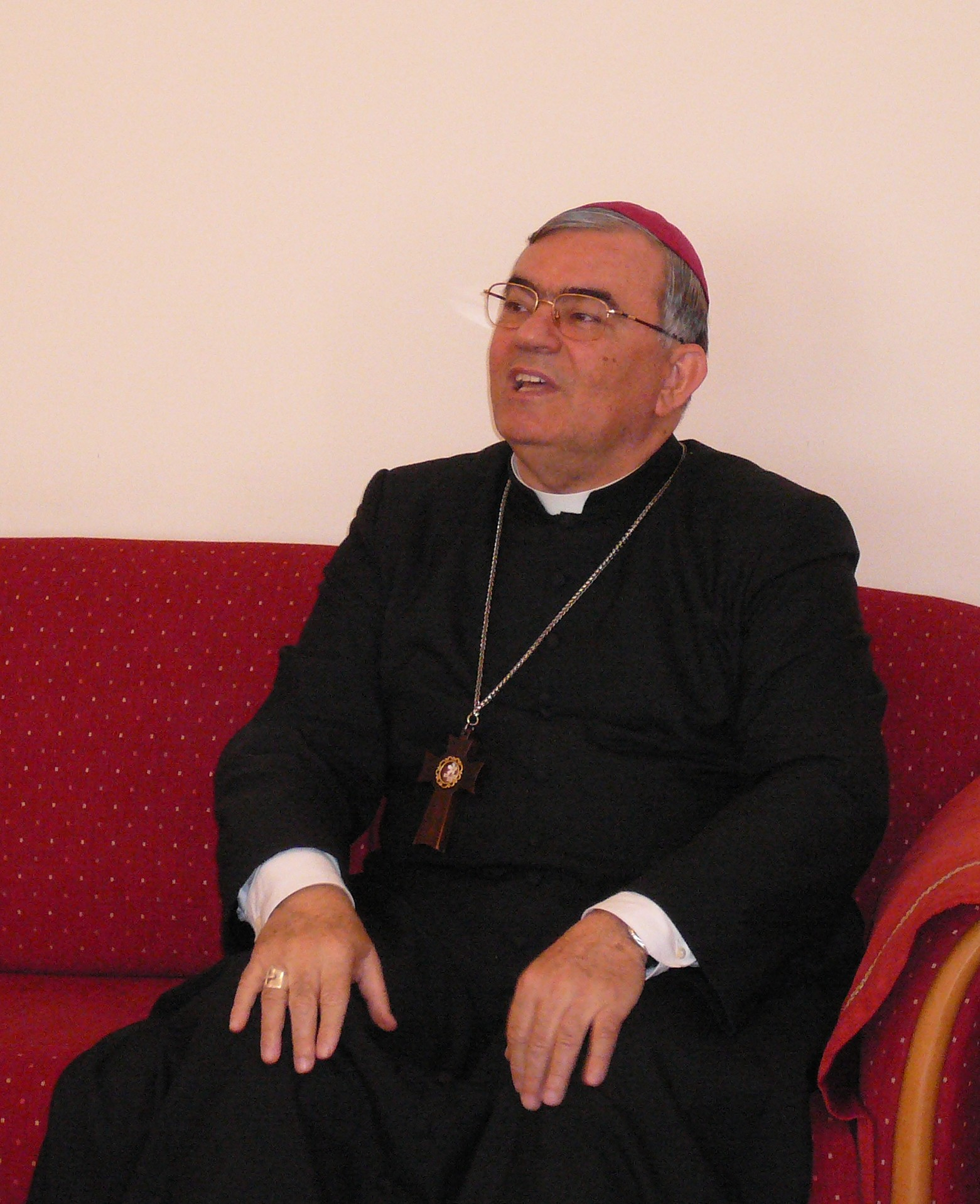
- Appointed: 29 April 1993

Orders
- Ordination: 22 June 1969
- Consecration: 3 July 1993

Personal details
- Born: 24 April 1945 (age 81) San Polo di Piave, Italy
- Denomination: Roman Catholic Church

Giacinto-Boulos Marcuzzo (born 24 April 1945, in San Polo di Piave, Italy) is a Roman Catholic Auxiliary Bishop Emeritus of the Latin Patriarchate of Jerusalem, resident in Nazareth. As at December 2020, he was Latin Patriarchal Vicar for Jerusalem and Palestine.

== Biography ==
Giacinto-Boulos Marcuzzo studied philosophy and theology at the Major Patriarchal Seminary in Beit Jala. He was ordained a priest on June 22, 1969 in the Church of All Nations. Then he worked as a chaplain in Beit Jala in the West Bank, in Ramallah and in Malakal in southern Sudan, including as director of the minor seminary. Marcuzzo was also teacher at the Minor Seminary of the Latin Patriarchate in Beit Jala.

In the years 1977-1980 Marcuzzo studied Dogmatic theology at the Pontifical Lateran University and theology of spirituality at the Teresianum in Rome. After obtaining a doctorate Marcuzzo became a lecturer at the Major Seminary in Beit Jala, being for a time its rector. He also lectured Patrology and Arabic Christian literature at the Bethlehem University.

In 1993 Marcuzzo was appointed Auxiliary Bishop of the Latin Patriarch of Jerusalem as Titular bishop of Siminina. He was consecrated bishop on the hands of the Latin Patriarch of Jerusalem Michel Sabbah on 3 July 1993 in the Church of the Holy Sepulchre. From 29 October 1994 he became titular bishop of Emmaus-Nicopolis. He resides in Nazareth as patriarchal vicar for Israel.

Marcuzzo is fluent in Italian, Arabic, French, English, German and Hebrew.

He retired on 29 August 2020.
