= Old City of Gaza =

Historical city center of Gaza, Palestine

Coordinates: 31°30′12″N 34°27′48″E

Old City of Gaza البلدة القديمة الغزة
- Old city
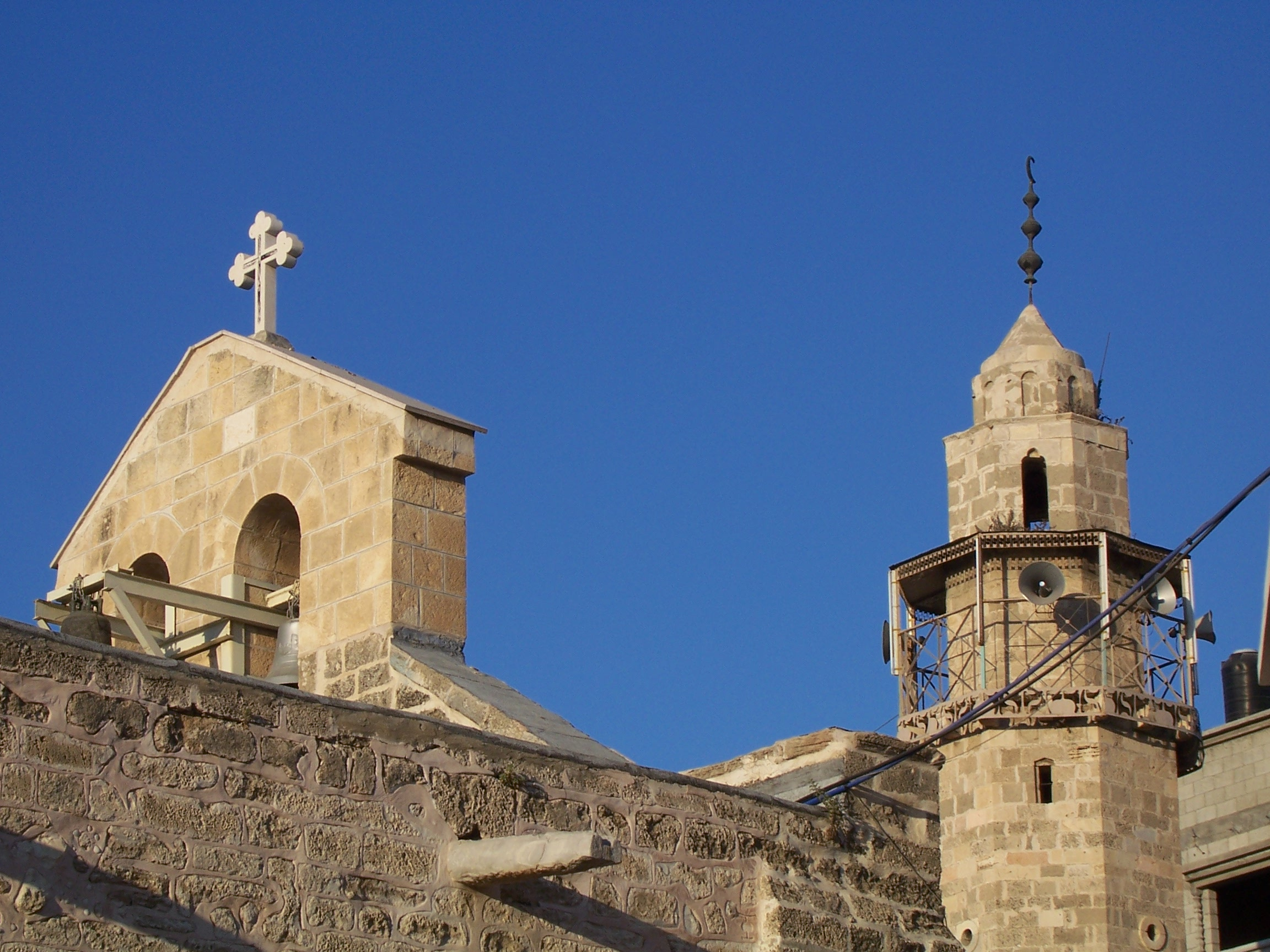
- Church of Saint Porphyrius and the Katib al-Wilaya Mosque

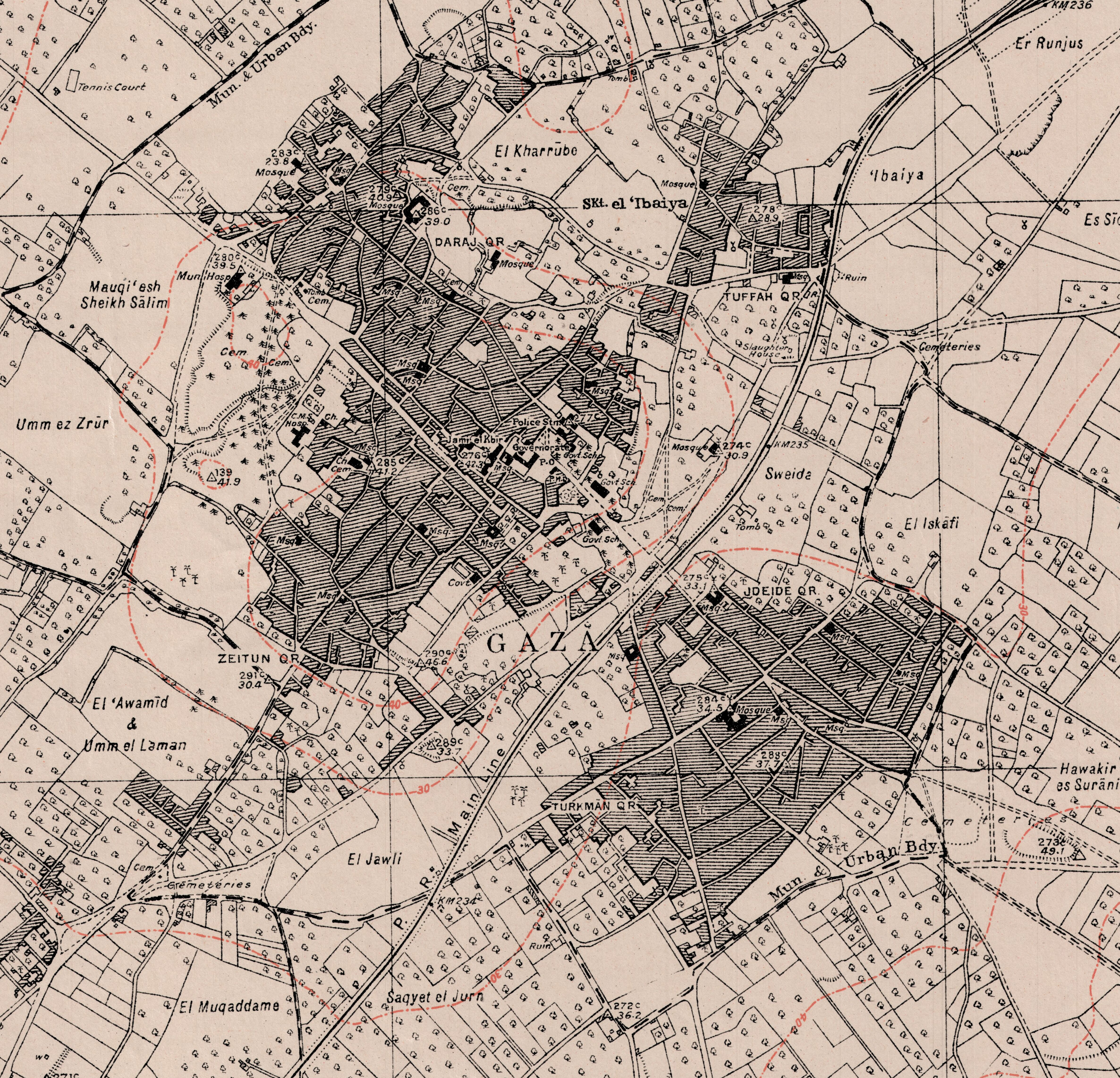
- 1931 Survey of Palestine map
- Interactive map of Old City of Gaza
- Country: Palestine
- City: Gaza City
- Established: 3000 BCE

Government
  - Control: Hamas

The Old City of Gaza is the historical center of Gaza City, in the Gaza Strip. It consists of a heavily built up urban area with many historical buildings on a 10–30 metre high low-lying tell covering an area of about 100 hectares (1.0 km^{2}). It sits at a distance of 3.5 km from the coastline of the Mediterranean Sea between two wadis: Wadi Gaza to the south, and Wadi el Hesi to the north.

For much of recorded history it has been the southernmost coastal city in the region of Palestine, occupying a strategic position on the ancient trade route the Via Maris, between Egypt and the Levant. Throughout its history, Gaza has been ruled by various empires, including the Philistines, Egyptians, Assyrians, Babylonians, Romans, and Ottomans. Following Israeli bombardment during the ongoing Gaza–Israel conflict, the Old City has been described in 2024 as "a vast field of ruins".

== History ==
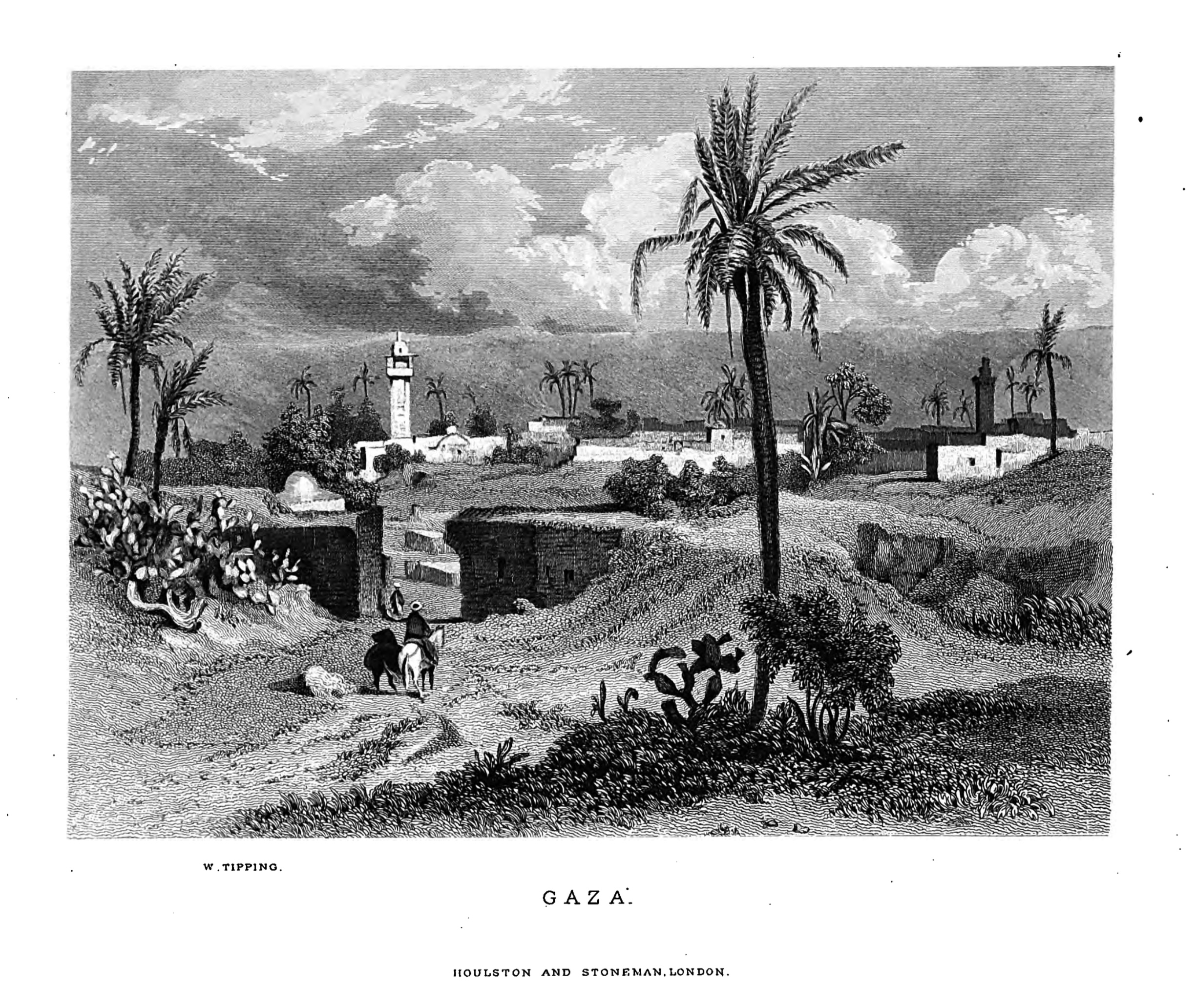
William Tipping 1840s sketch of Gaza City

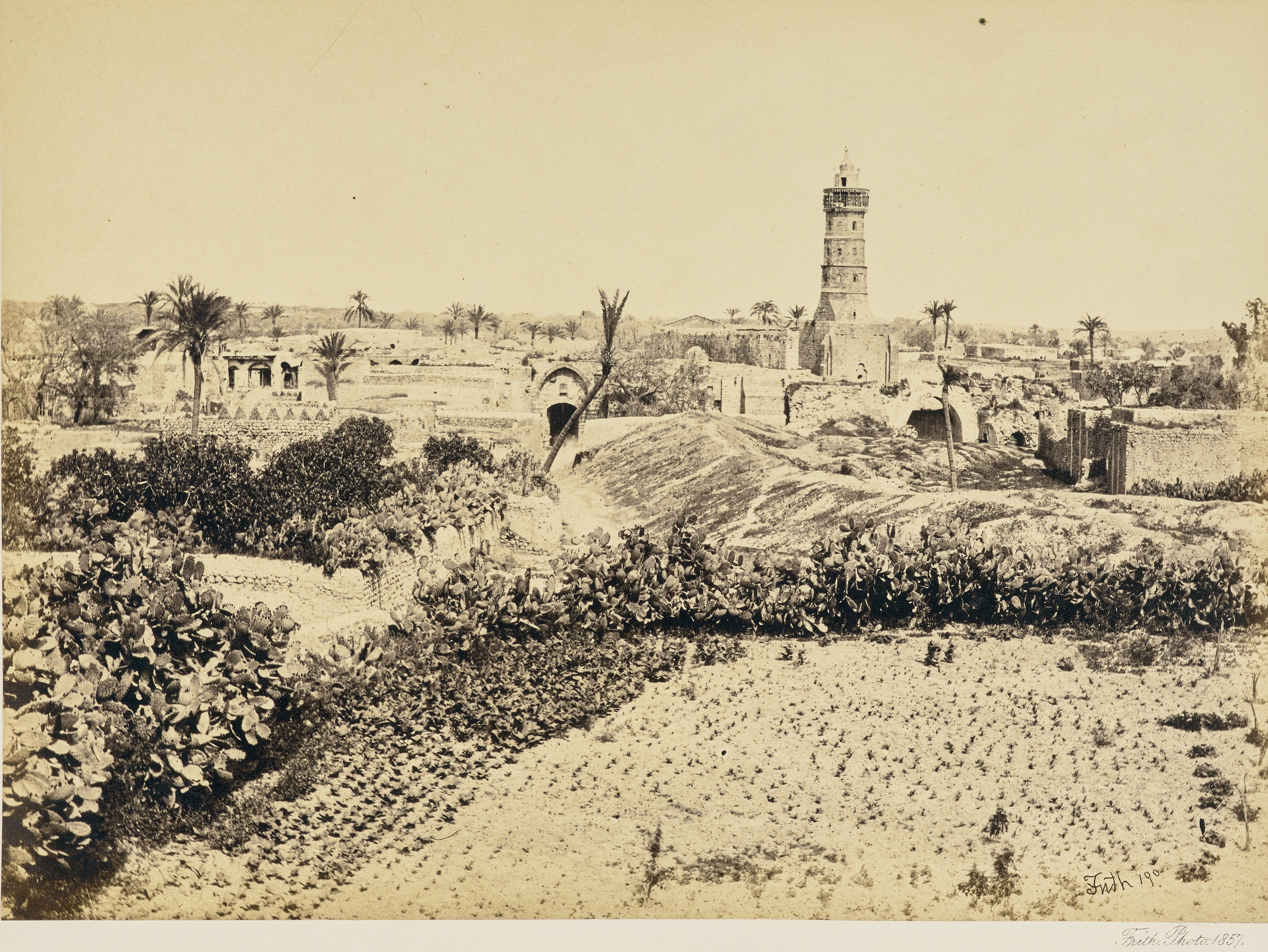
Francis Frith's 1857 photograph of the Old City of Gaza

The city's origins trace back to around 3000 BCE, when it was first established by the Canaanites. Gaza rose to prominence due to its location on the Via Maris trade route that links Africa and Asia, serving as a hub for merchants and travelers. Like the wider region, it subsequently fell under the control of the Egyptian, Assyrian, and the Persian empires. Alexander the Great captured the city in 332 BC following a siege which killed most of the inhabitants. The area changed hands regularly between two Greek successor-kingdoms, the Seleucids of Syria and the Ptolemies of Egypt, with a particularly notable battle in 312 BC, until it was besieged and taken by the Hasmoneans in 96 BC. The city was rebuilt by Roman General Pompey, and maintained its prosperity throughout the Roman period, receiving grants from several different emperors. It grew as a center for the trade of spices and perfumes during this period.

The city's conversion to Christianity was spearheaded and completed under Saint Porphyrius, who destroyed its eight pagan temples between 396 and 420 AD. Gaza was conquered by the Muslim general Amr ibn al-As in 637 AD and most Gazans adopted Islam during early Muslim rule. The Crusaders wrested control of Gaza from the Fatimids in 1100, but were driven out by Saladin's forces in a battle in 1239. The city was destroyed during the Mongol raids into Palestine; it was the Mongol's southernmost point of conquest. Gaza was in Mamluk hands by the late 13th century, and became a regional capital. Under the Ottomans the city continued as the regional capital of the Gaza Sanjak, and witnessed a golden age under the Ridwan dynasty from c.1560-1690. Gaza was culturally dominated by neighboring Egypt from the early 19th century; Muhammad Ali of Egypt conquered it and most of Palestine in 1832. When World War I erupted in 1917, British forces were defeated by the Ottomans in the first and second Battle of Gaza. General Edmund Allenby, leading the Allied Forces, finally conquered Gaza in a third battle.

The city expanded outside of the area of the Old City during the twentieth century. In modern times, much of the Old City was destroyed by Israeli bombardment during the ongoing Gaza–Israel conflict. In 2026 Palestine began the process of proposing the Old City of Gaza as a World Heritage Site.

== Neighborhoods ==
The Old City of Gaza is divided into four main quarters, some of which have subdivisions. Three of these quarters — Tuffah, Daraj, and Zaytun — were located within the walls of the ancient city, while the southeastern quarter, Shuja'iyya, developed later, mostly outside its walls:

- Daraj Quarter ("The Stairs Quarter"): Located in the northwest (generally west), this is the oldest part of the city, sometimes referred to as the old city of Gaza proper. It is known for its narrow streets and traditional homes. It sits on an hill about 20 meters above the surrounding plain and other parts of the city. The name likely comes from the stairs that led up to it or the sensation of climbing stairs when approaching the area.
- Zaytun Quarter ("The Olive Quarter"): Situated in the southwest (generally south), this quarter is named after its historical olive groves. It is the largest quarter within the old city walls. It contains the St. Porphyrius Church. The medieval Khan az-Zayt formed the historical border between the Zaytun Quarter and the Daraj Quarter; this was demolished under Djemal Pasha during the later years of Ottoman rule, and replaced with a road currently named Umar al-Mukhtär Street which now forms the boundary between the two quarters.
- Tuffah ("The Apple Quarter"): Located in the northeast (generally north), this quarter is known as the Apple Quarter. The southern part of this quarter, called ad-Dabbäghah, was historically the tanners' neighborhood, which was situated near the Ottoman-era slaughterhouse.
- Shuja'iyya: This southeastern quarter, which developed during the Middle Ages, mostly lies outside the ancient city walls. Its location outside the walls allowed it to expand significantly, eventually surpassing the Zaytun Quarter in size. The quarter is subdivided into two parts: al-Judaydah (also known as Saja'iyyat al-Akrād, or "The Saja'iyyah of the Kurds") in the northeast and at-Turkmän in the south.

== Architecture and landmarks ==
The Old City of Gaza is renowned for its architectural landmarks, many of which date back to the Mamluk and Ottoman periods. The dense urban fabric includes mosques, churches, bathhouses, and markets that showcase a blend of Byzantine, Mamluk, and Ottoman architectural styles. Despite modern development, the Old City retains many elements of its historical layout.

- Great Mosque of Gaza (Al-Omari Mosque) – Originally a Byzantine church, converted into a mosque during the Islamic period.
- Church of Saint Porphyrius – A Byzantine-era church serving the local Greek Orthodox community.
- Sayed al-Hashim Mosque – said to contain the tomb of Hashim ibn Abd al-Manaf, Muhammad's great grandfather who died in Gaza.
- Hamam al-Sammara – A traditional bathhouse from the Mamluk period.
- Qasr al-Basha (Napoleon's Fort) – An Ottoman palace where Napoleon Bonaparte is said to have stayed.
- Gold Market (Souk Al-Qaysariyya) – A historic market specializing in gold and jewelry.
- Old City Walls – Remnants of the fortifications that once encircled the city.

== Archaeology ==
The ancient tell upon which the Old City sits has never been thoroughly excavated, for a number of reasons, including biases towards sites more important to biblical archaeology, fluctuating political conditions and upheavals, as well as the density of the existing built structures, many of which are also historically valuable. Its northwestern side is called Tel el-Kharrubi (or Tel el-Harubeh), so name for the cemetery there where an honoured wali, Sheikh el-Kharrubi is buried.

== Maps and images ==
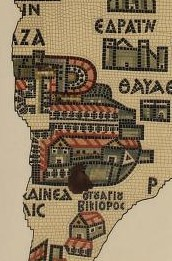
500s CE Madaba Map

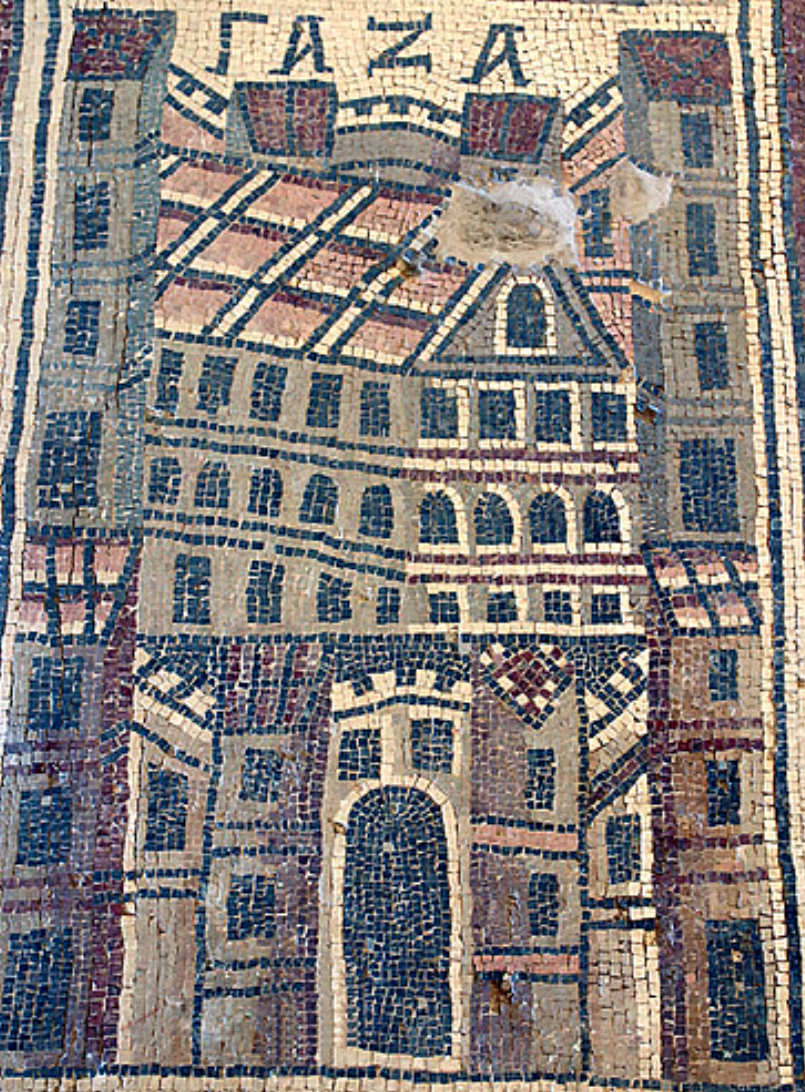
700s CE Umm ar-Rasas mosaics

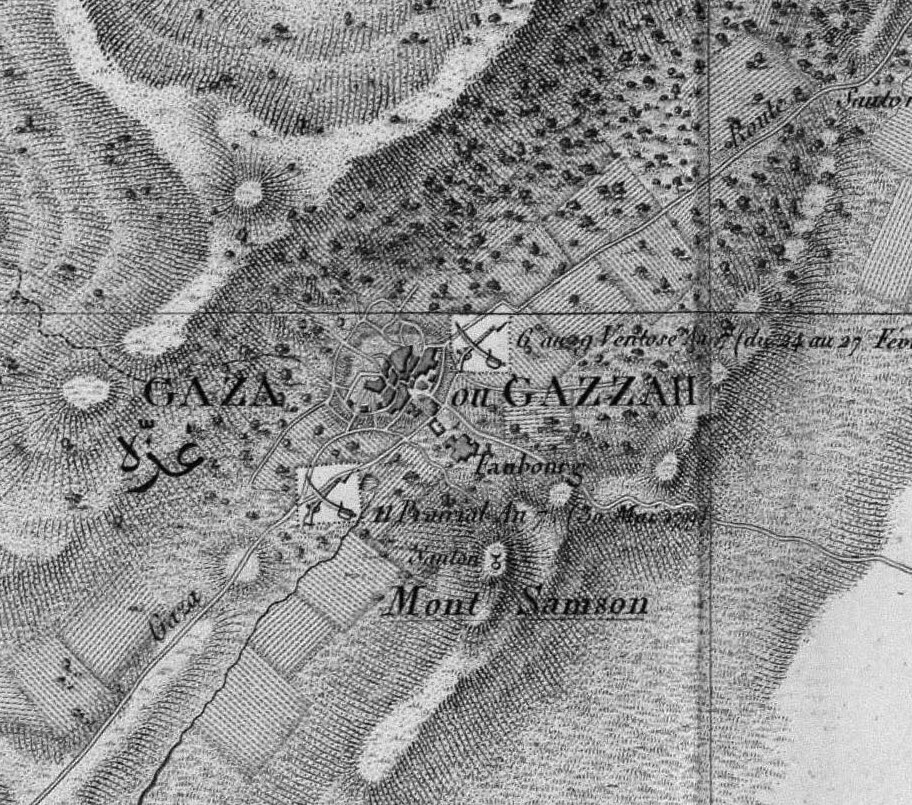
1799, Carte de l'Égypte, showing the battles during the French invasion of Egypt and Syria

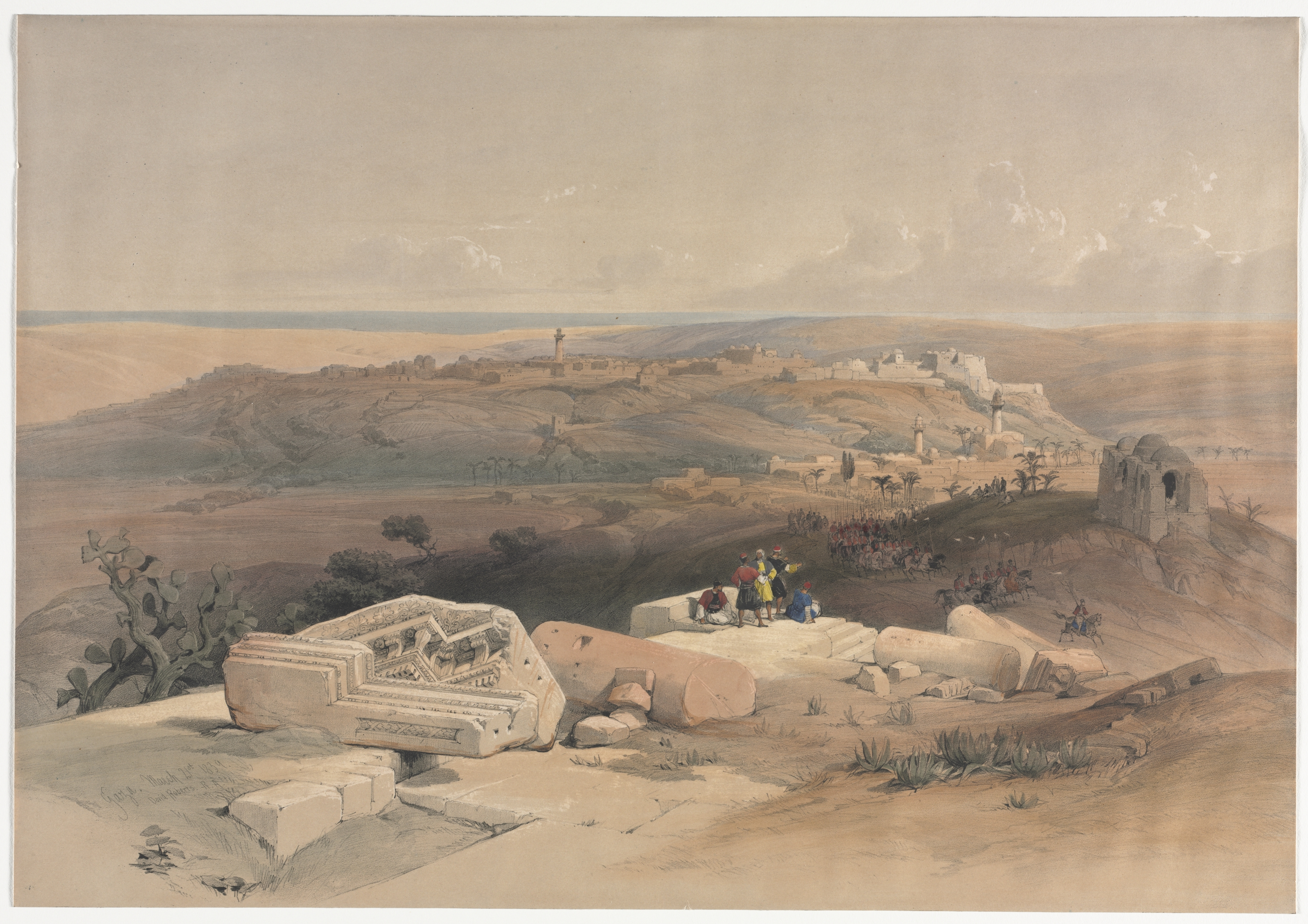
1839 The Holy Land, Syria, Idumea, Arabia, Egypt, and Nubia

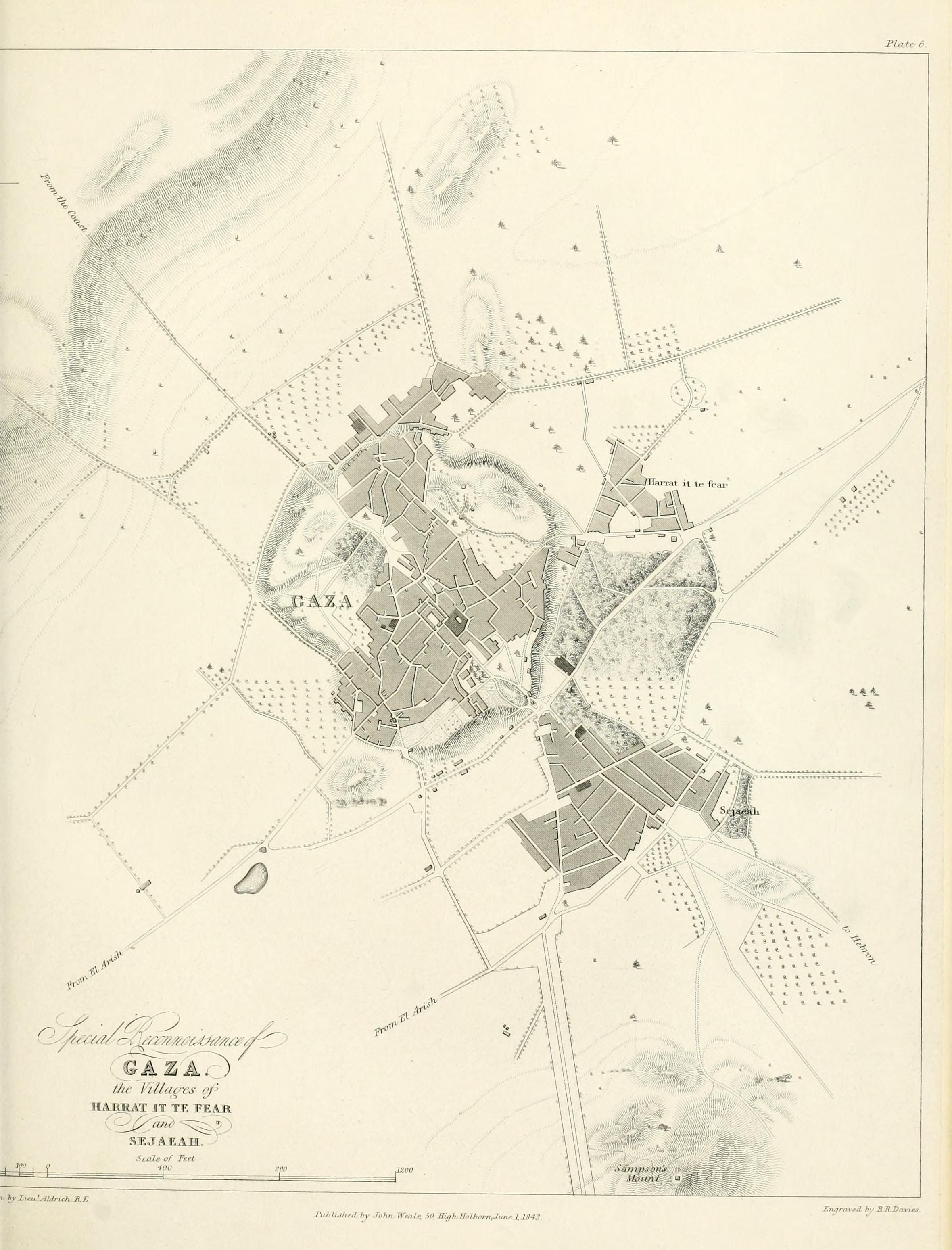
1840–41 Royal Engineers

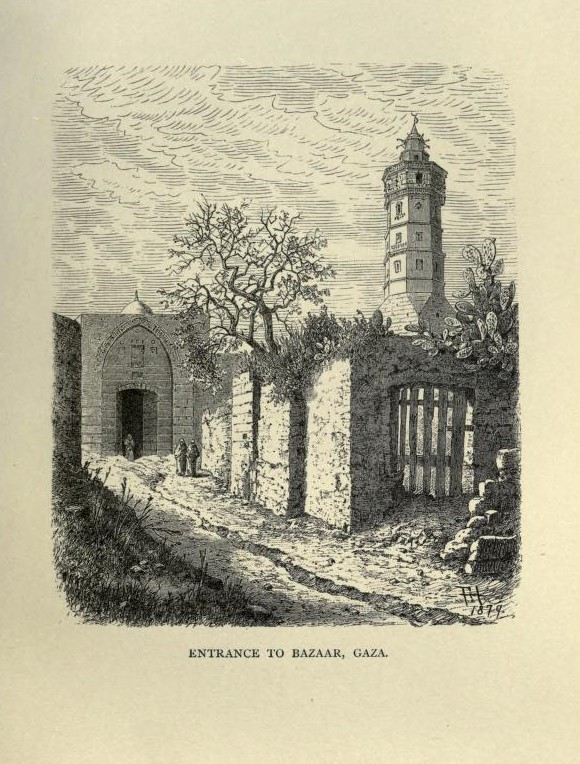
1879 Archduke Ludwig Salvator of Austria

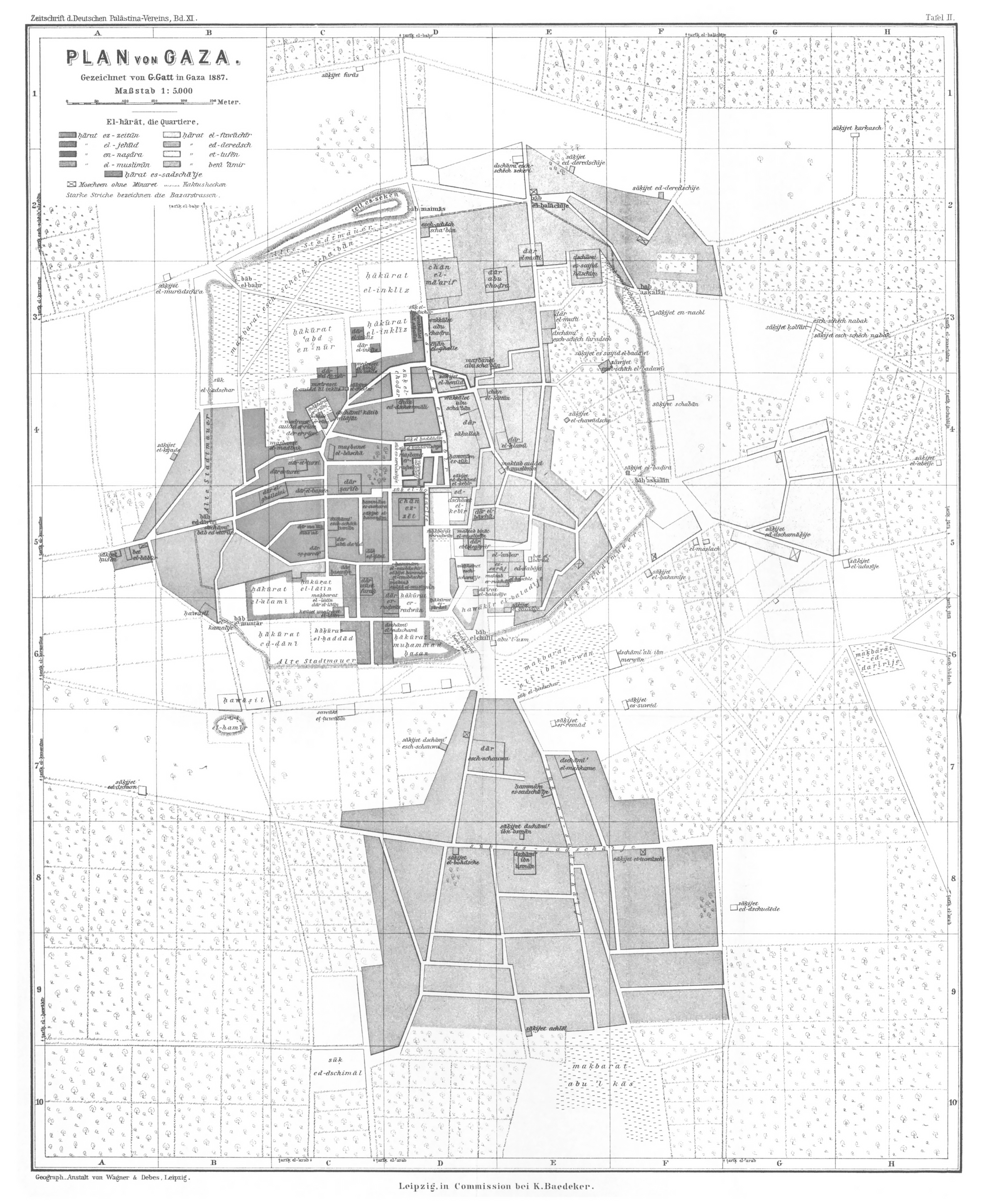
1887-88, Georg Gatt 1–5,000,

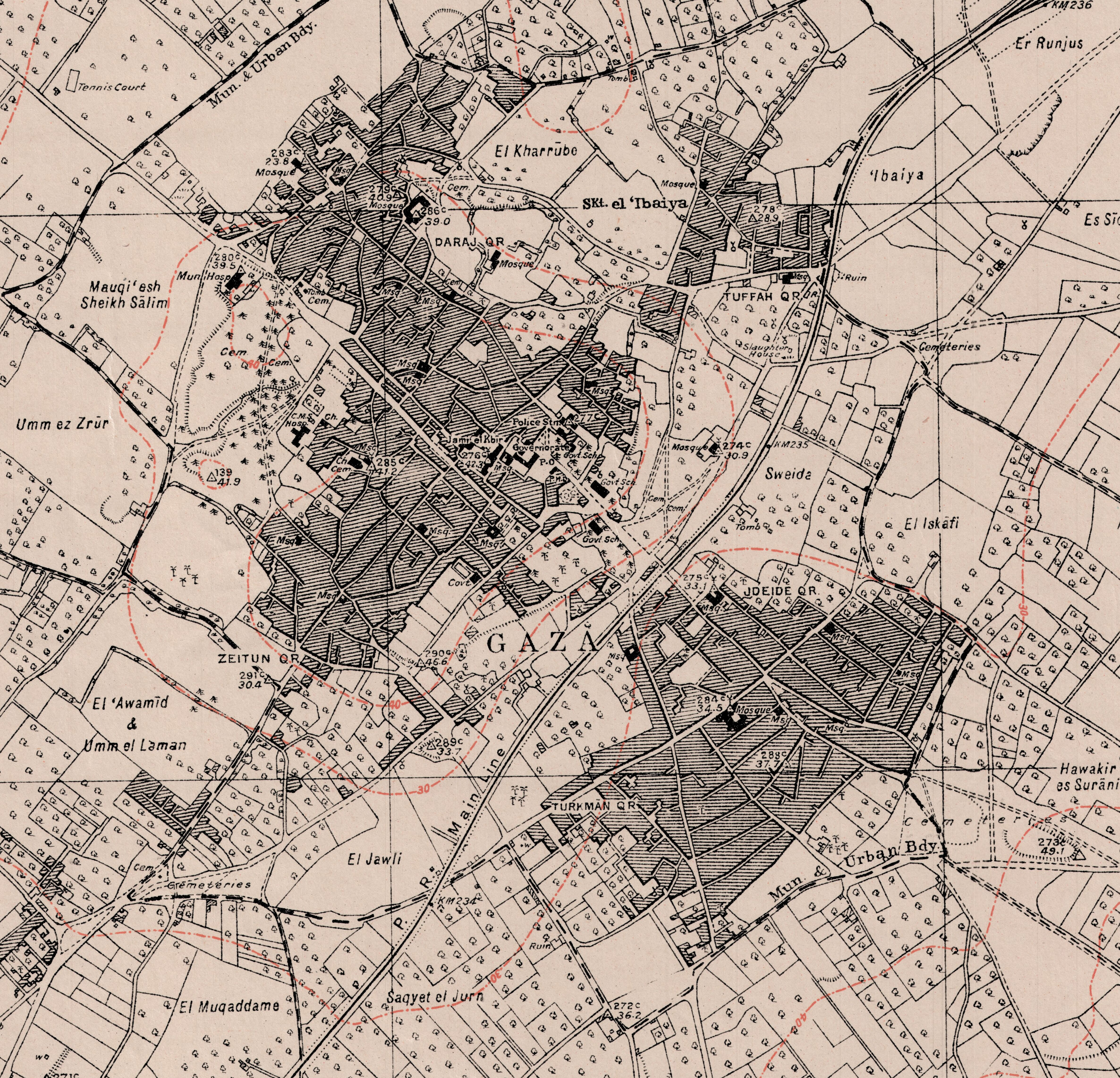
1931, Survey of Palestine 1–10,000

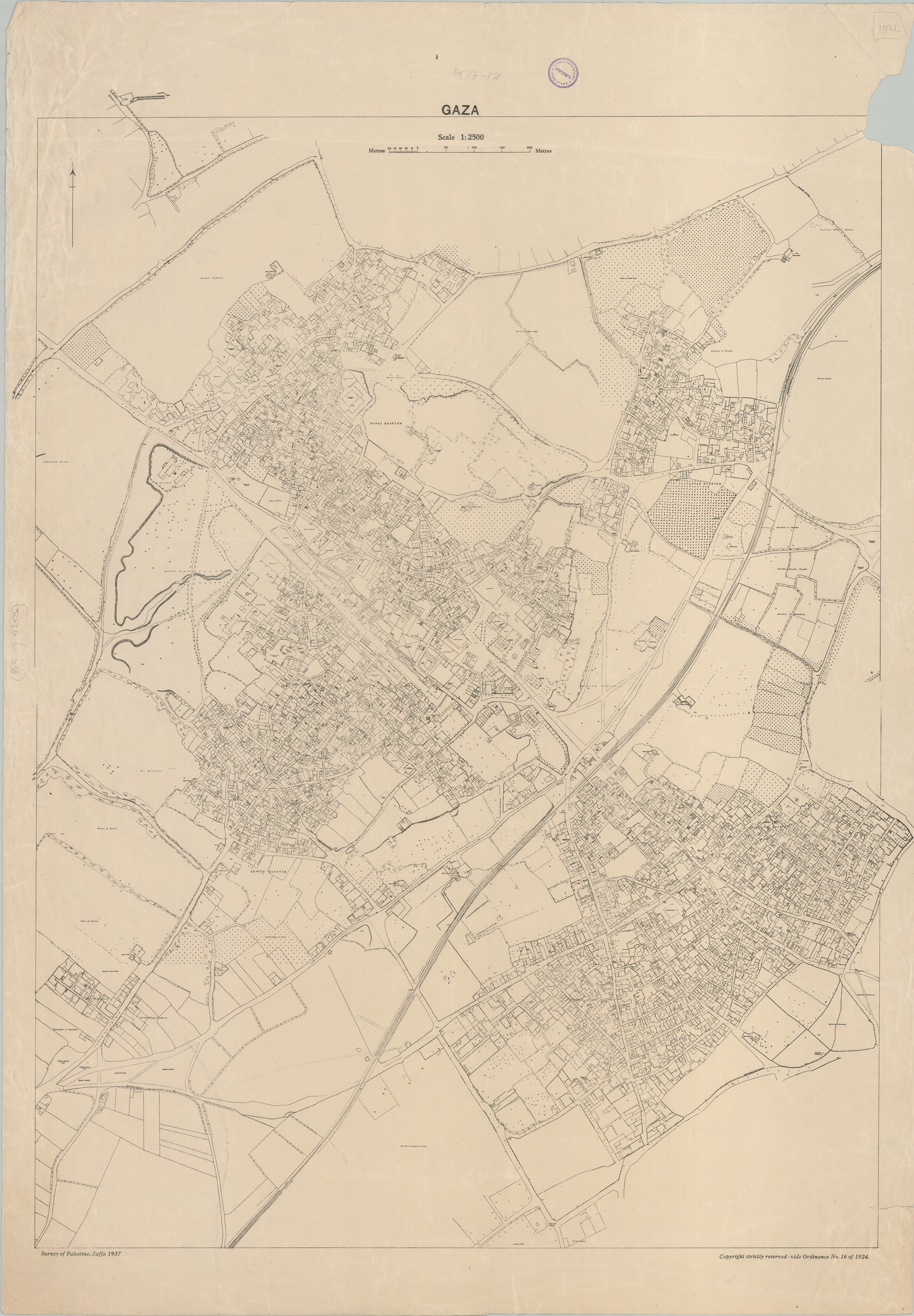
1937, Survey of Palestine 1–2,500

== See also ==
- Old City of Hebron
- Old City of Jerusalem
- List of archaeological sites in the Gaza Strip

== Bibliography ==
- Al-Qeeq, Farid (2011-03-01). "A Comprehensive Approach to Incorporate Architectural Heritage of Gaza Old City into Contemporary Urban Fabric". Lonaard Journal. 1 (2): 109-. ISSN 2045-8150.
- Al-Qeeq, Farid S (2009-01-01). "A Sustainable Approach for Urban Integration of Hammam Sammrah in the Historic City of Gaza". International Journal of Architectural Research: Archnet-IJAR.
- Clarke, Joanne; Steel, Louise; Sadeq, Moain (2004). "Gaza Research Project: 1998 Survey of the Old City of Gaza". Levant. 36 (1). Informa UK Limited: 31–36. doi:10.1179/lev.2004.36.1.31. ISSN 0075-8914.
- Gatt, Georg (1888). "Legende zum Plane von Gaza". Zeitschrift des Deutschen Palästina-Vereins. 11. Deutscher Verein zur Erforschung Palästinas: 149–159. ISSN 2192-3124. JSTOR 27928513.
- Sharon, Moshe (2009). "Gaza". Corpus Inscriptionum Arabicarum Palaestinae. Vol. 4. BRILL. pp. 15–213. ISBN 978-90-04-17085-8.
