= 1840–41 Royal Engineers maps of Palestine, Lebanon and Syria =

British military maps

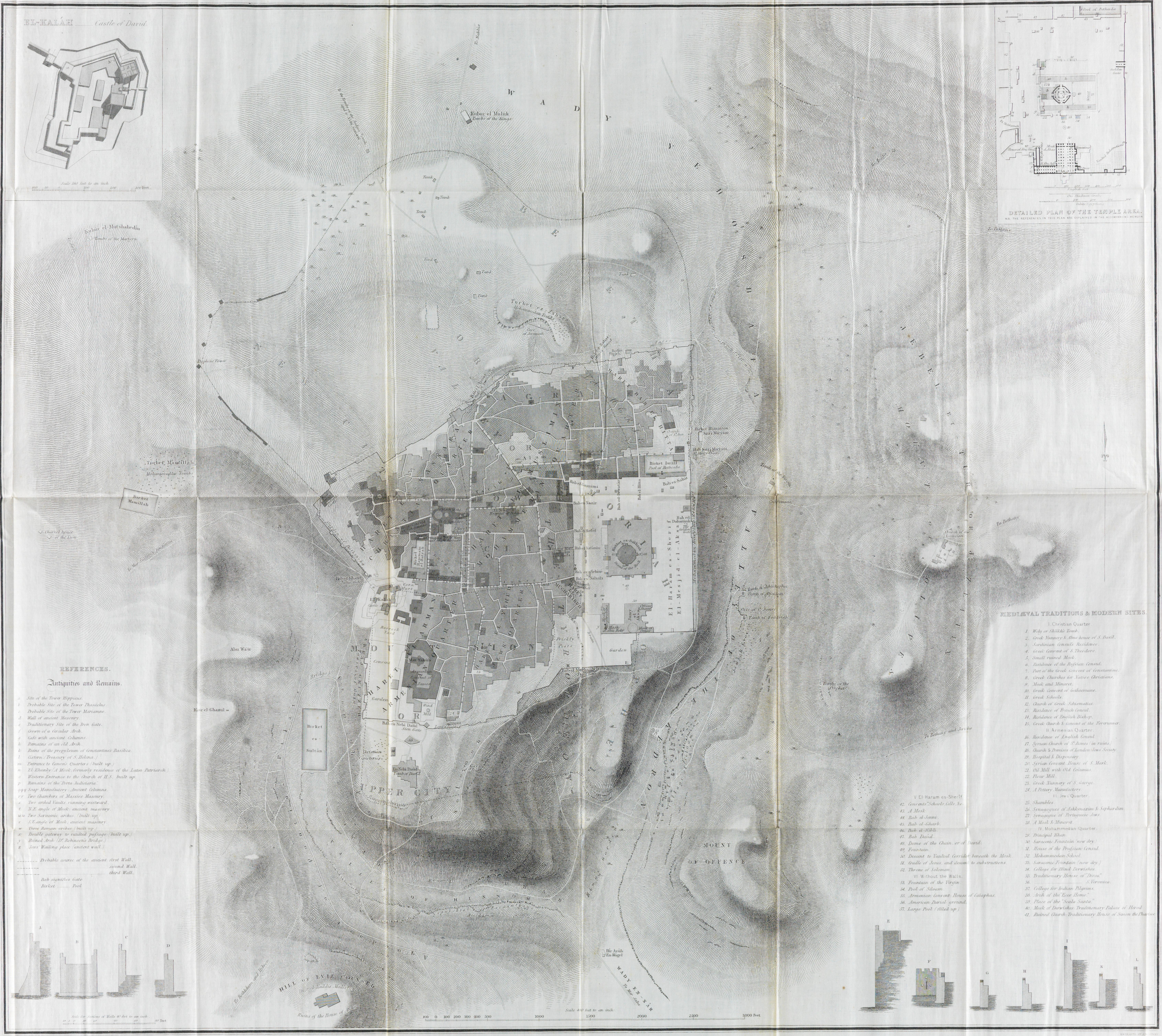
- The Aldrich and Symonds map of Jerusalem
- Created: 1840–1841
- Location: The National Archives (United Kingdom)
- Author: Royal Engineers

The 1840–41 Royal Engineers maps of Palestine, Lebanon and Syria was an early scientific mapping of Palestine (including a detailed mapping of Jerusalem), Lebanon and Syria.

It represented the second modern, triangulation-based attempt at surveying Palestine, following the French Carte de l'Égypte.

It has occasionally been mislabeled as an Ordnance Survey map; in fact none of the officers worked for the Ordnance Survey, which was a separate organization. The Ordnance Survey of Jerusalem, carried out almost 25 years later, was a separate and materially more detailed endeavor.

== Jerusalem map ==
The Jerusalem map was printed privately for the Board of Ordnance in August 1841. It was published in a reduced form in Ralph Carr Alderson's ‘’Professional Papers of the Royal Engineers’’ in 1845, and subsequently as a supplement to the 1849 second edition of Reverend George Williams' The Holy City: Historical, Topographical, and Antiquarian Notices of Jerusalem together with a 130-page memoir on the plan. The memoir contained a three-page appendix defending the plan from criticism received from Edward Robinson.

The map may have been the source of the modern tradition of dividing Jerusalem into four "quarters". Matthew Teller writes that this convention may have originated in the 1841 map, or at least George Williams' subsequent labelling of it.

== Acre, Gaza, Haifa and Jaffa maps ==
The maps of the Old City of Acre, Old City of Gaza, Old City of Haifa and Old Jaffa were published in Ralph Carr Alderson's Notes on Acre and Some of the Coast Defences of Syria in 1843.

== Regional maps ==
Some of the regional maps were never published in their entirety. A private printing for the British Foreign Office was produced in 1846. The only published map, Map 2, was published in Charles Henry Churchill's book on Mount Lebanon. Map 3 was used in the creation of Van de Velde's map.

Charles Wilson later explained that the data "was in too fragmentary a state for publication".

== Criticism ==
The survey contained a number of flaws. The theodolite was often operated by Symonds alone, miscalculations were made around heights (e.g. on the Sea of Galilee), and the outlines of the Haram es-Sharif in Jerusalem were known to have been miscalculated. As such, scholars such as Edward Robinson and August Petermann chose not to trust the work.

== List of officers involved in the survey ==
- Edward Aldrich
- Julian Symonds
- Charles Rochfort Scott
- Ralph Carr Alderson
- Frederick Robe
- Charles Francis Skyring
- Richard Wilbraham

== Gallery ==
=== Regional maps ===
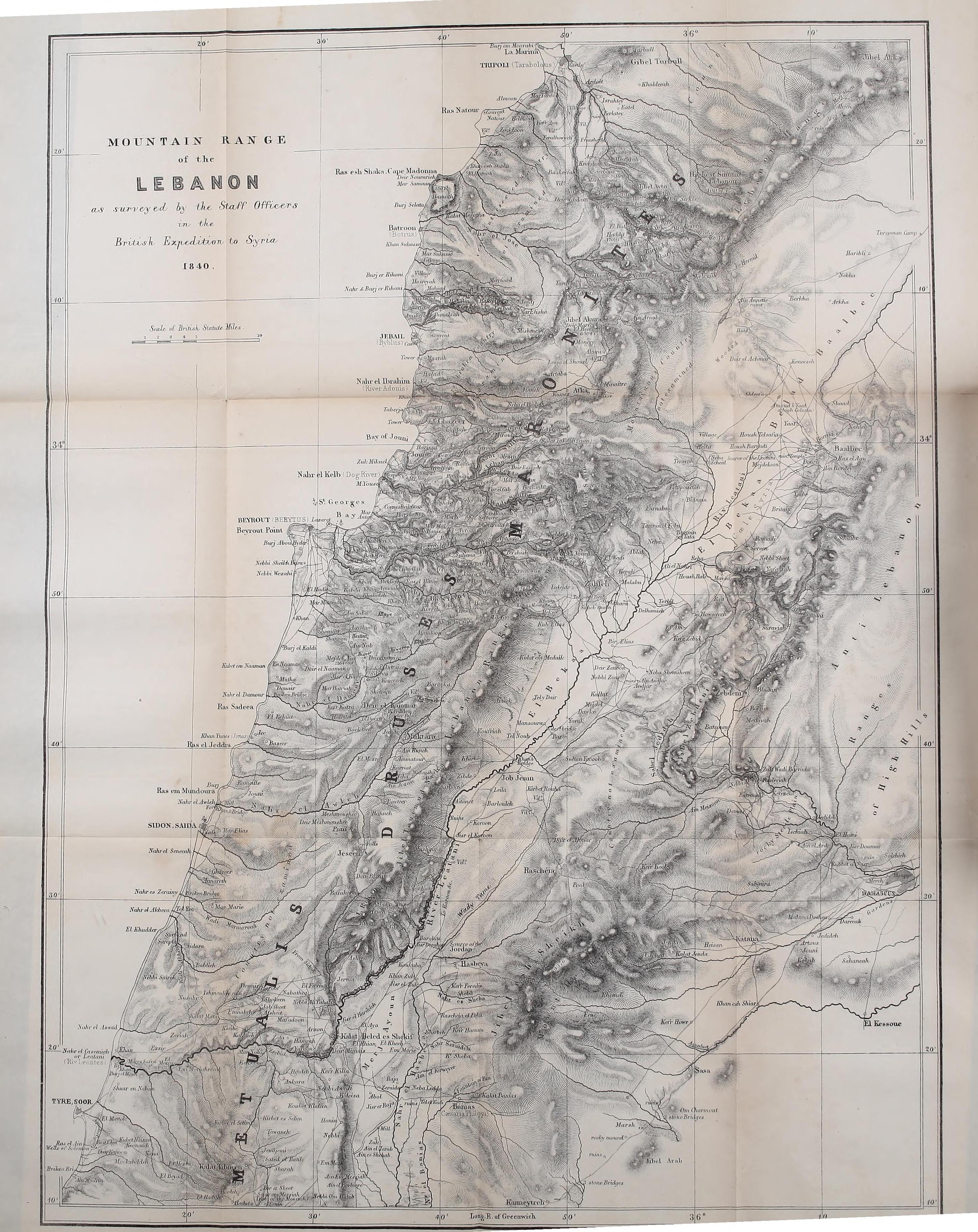
Sheet 2: Mount Lebanon

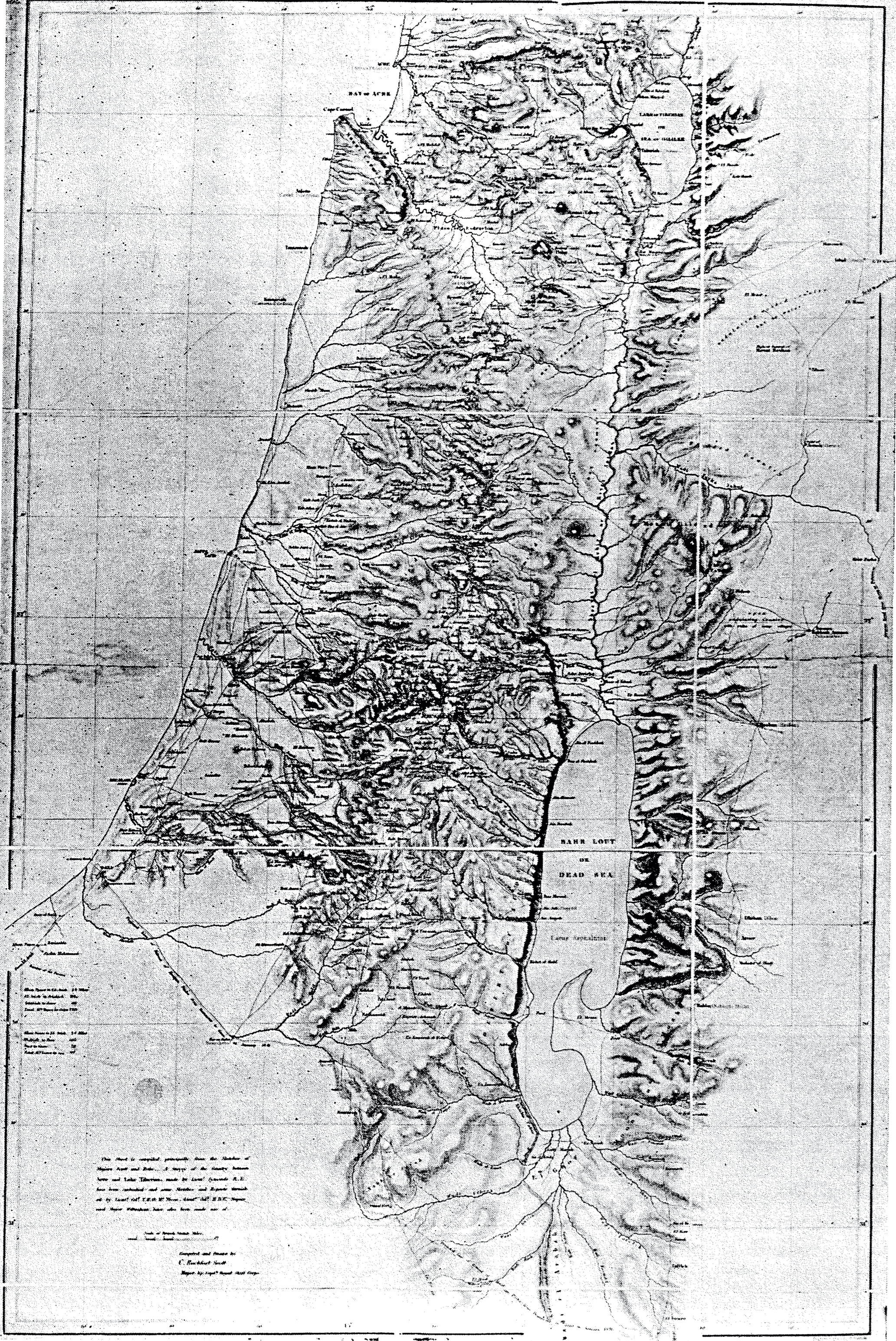
Sheet 3: Palestine

=== City maps ===
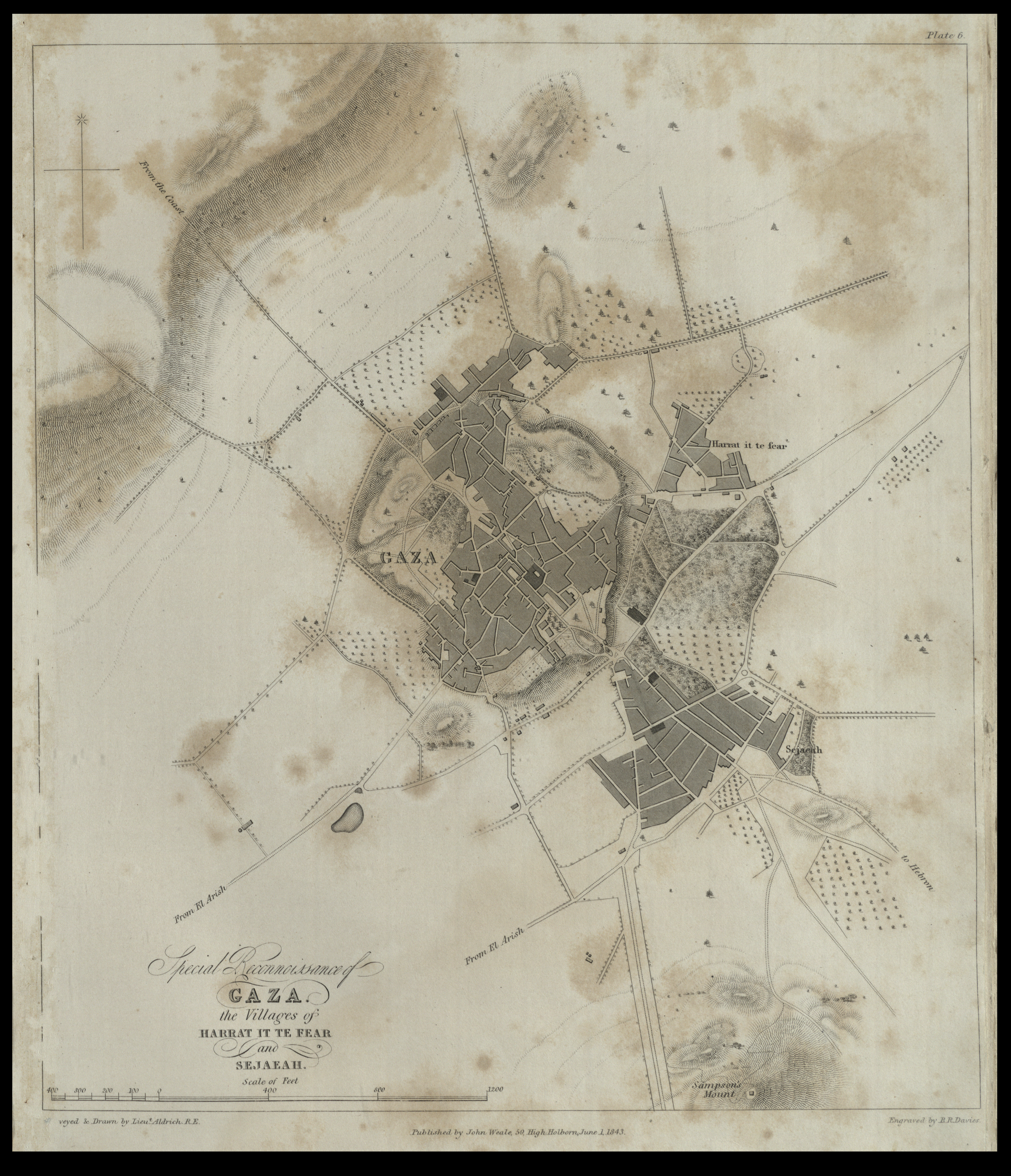
Old City of Gaza

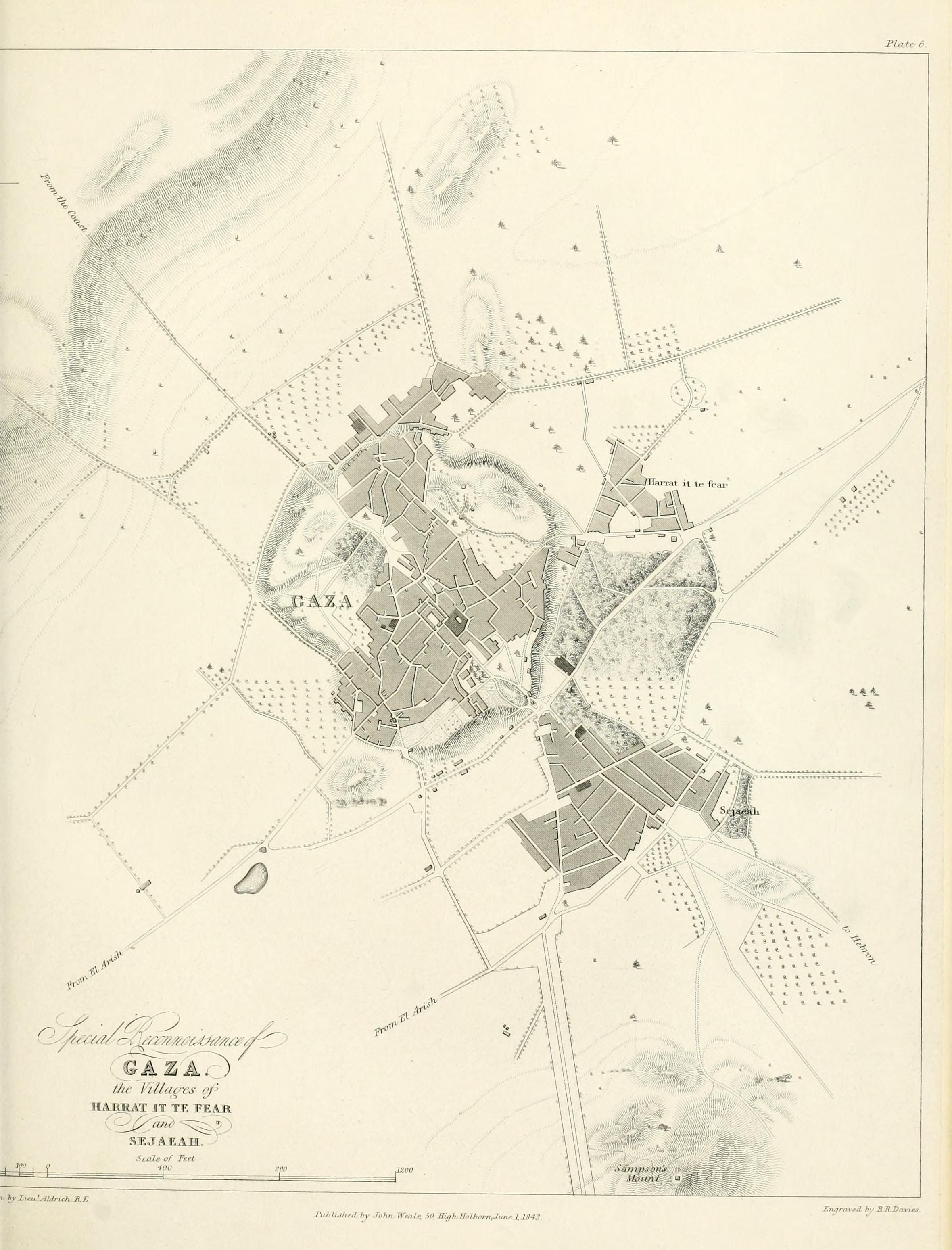
Old City of Gaza

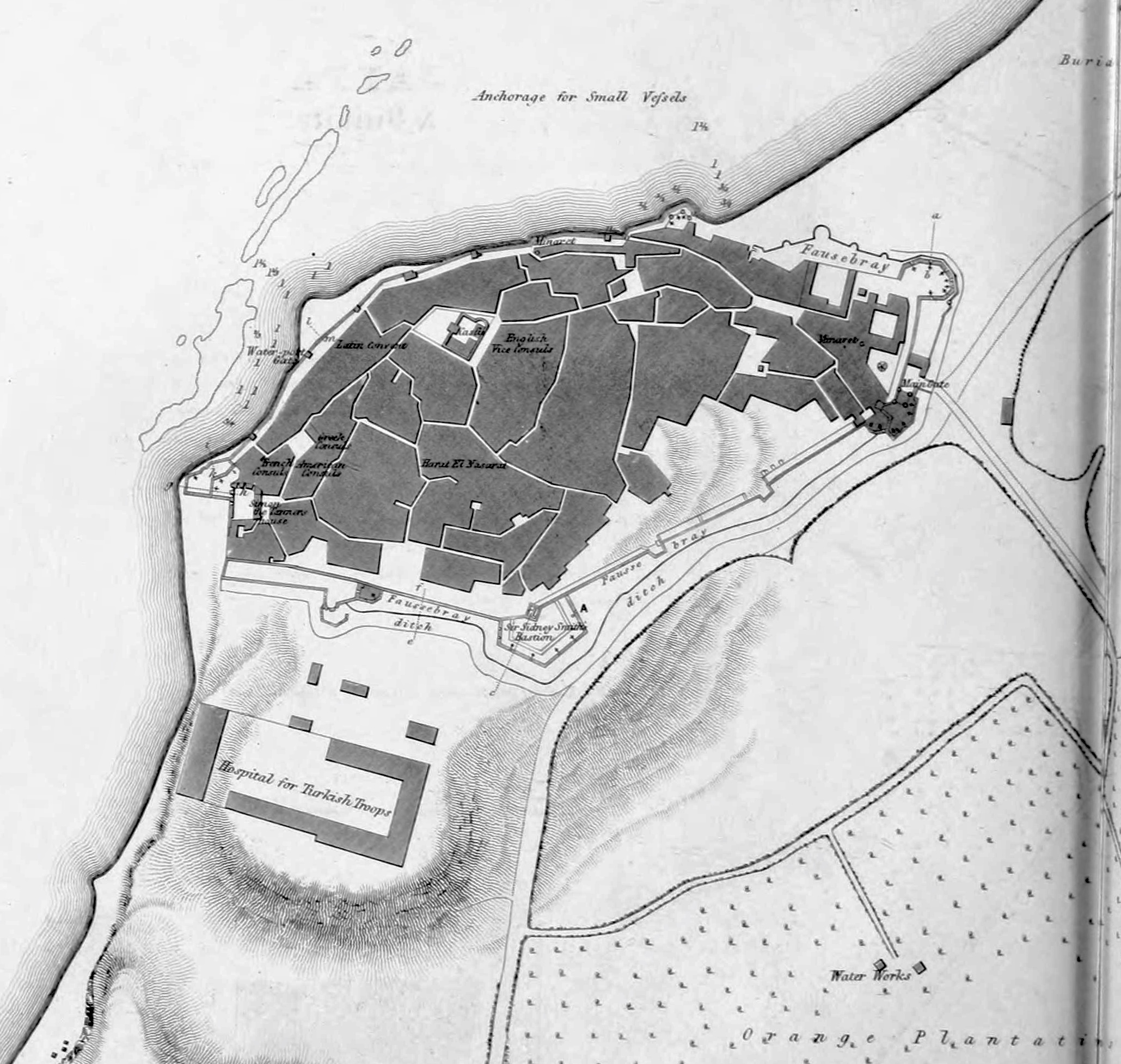
Old Jaffa

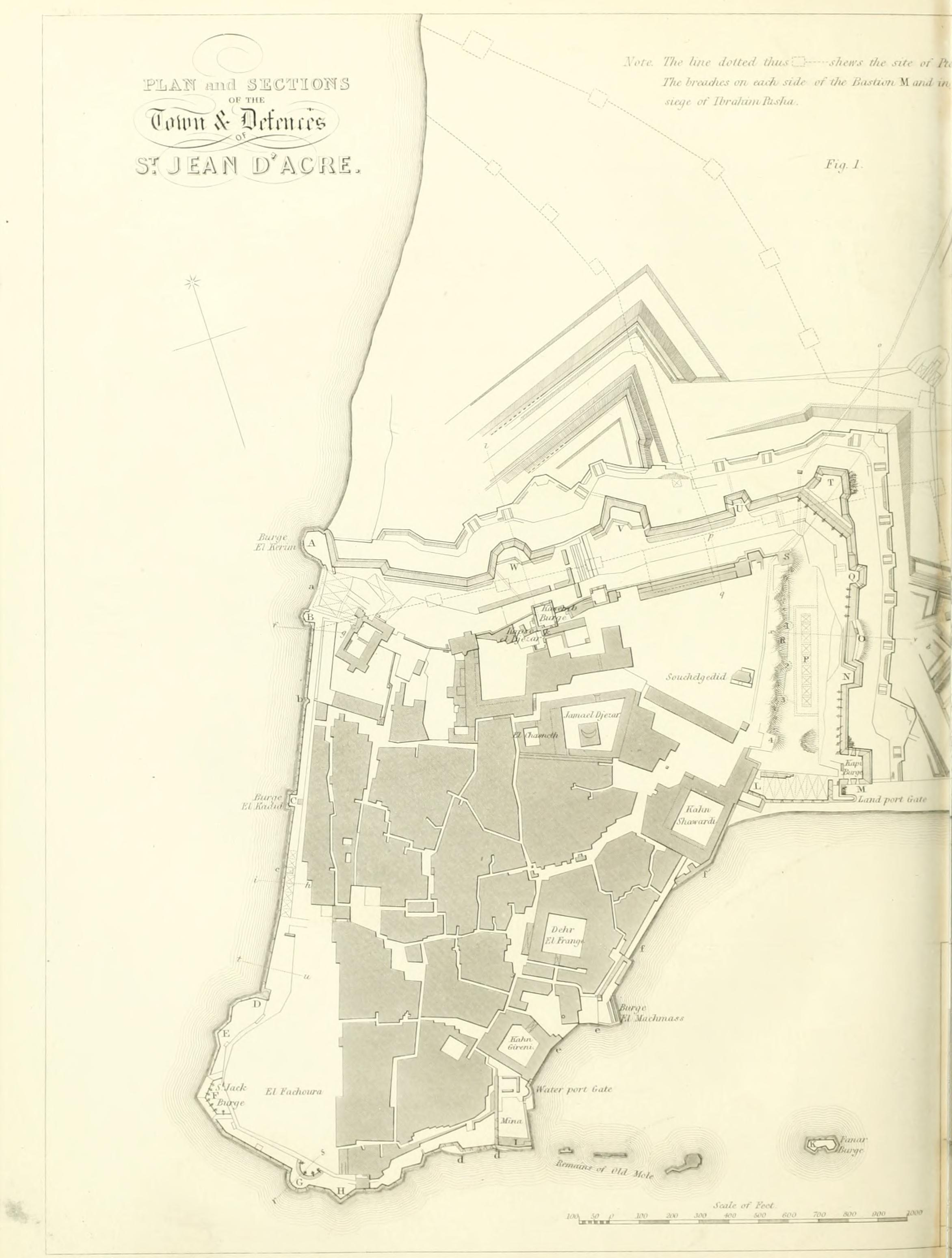
Old City of Acre

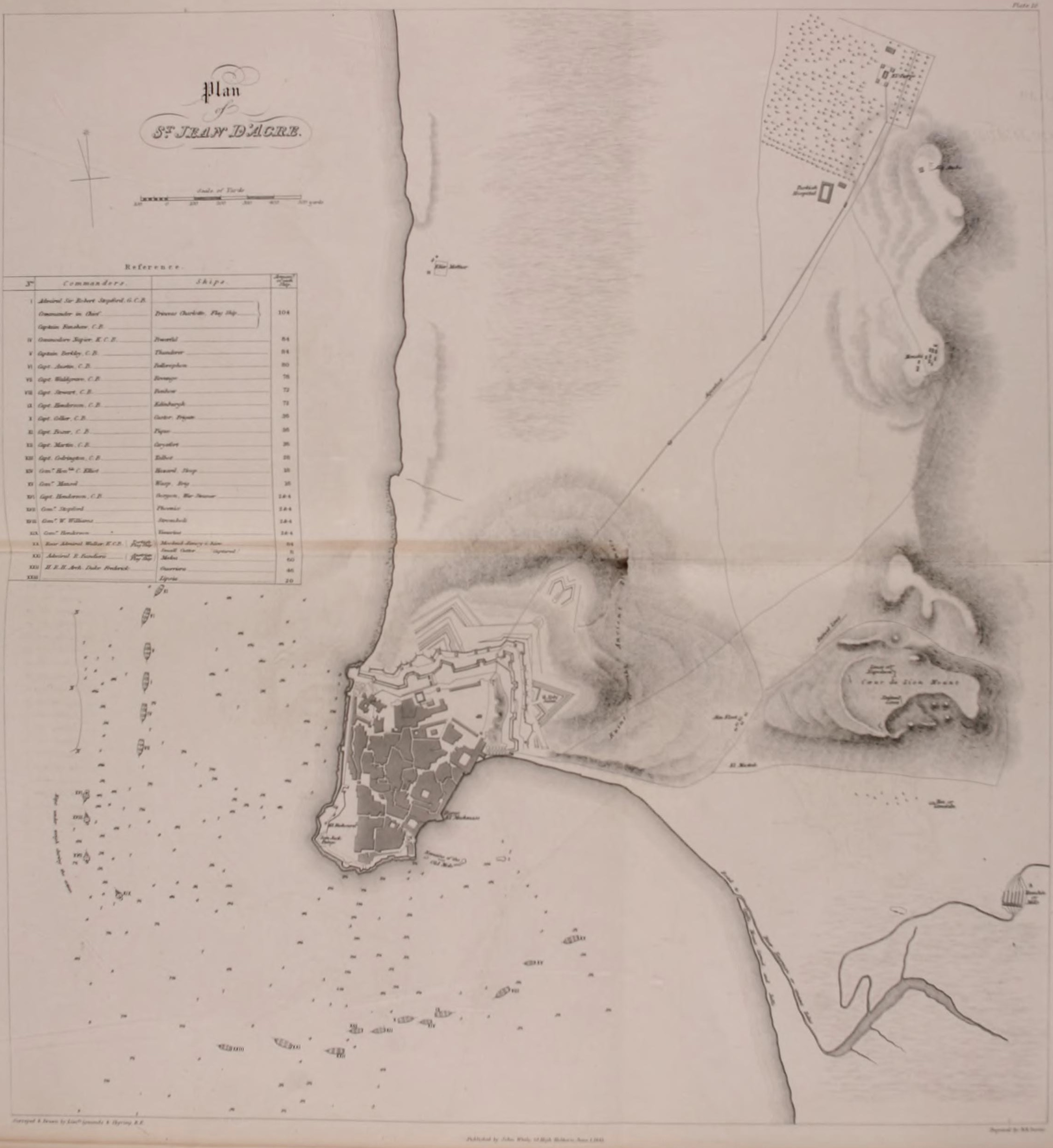
Old City of Acre and surrounding regions

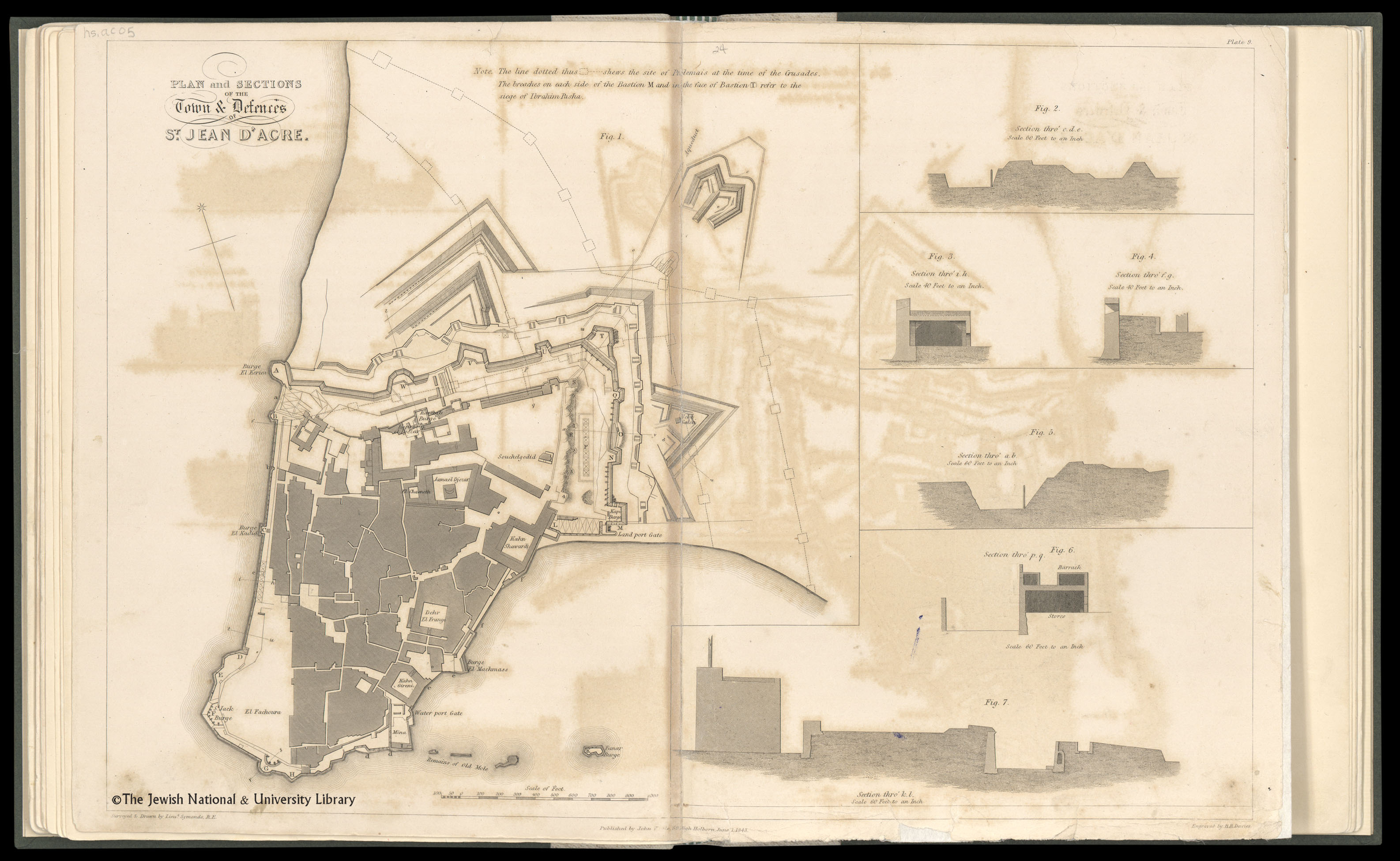
Old City of Acre and related diagrams

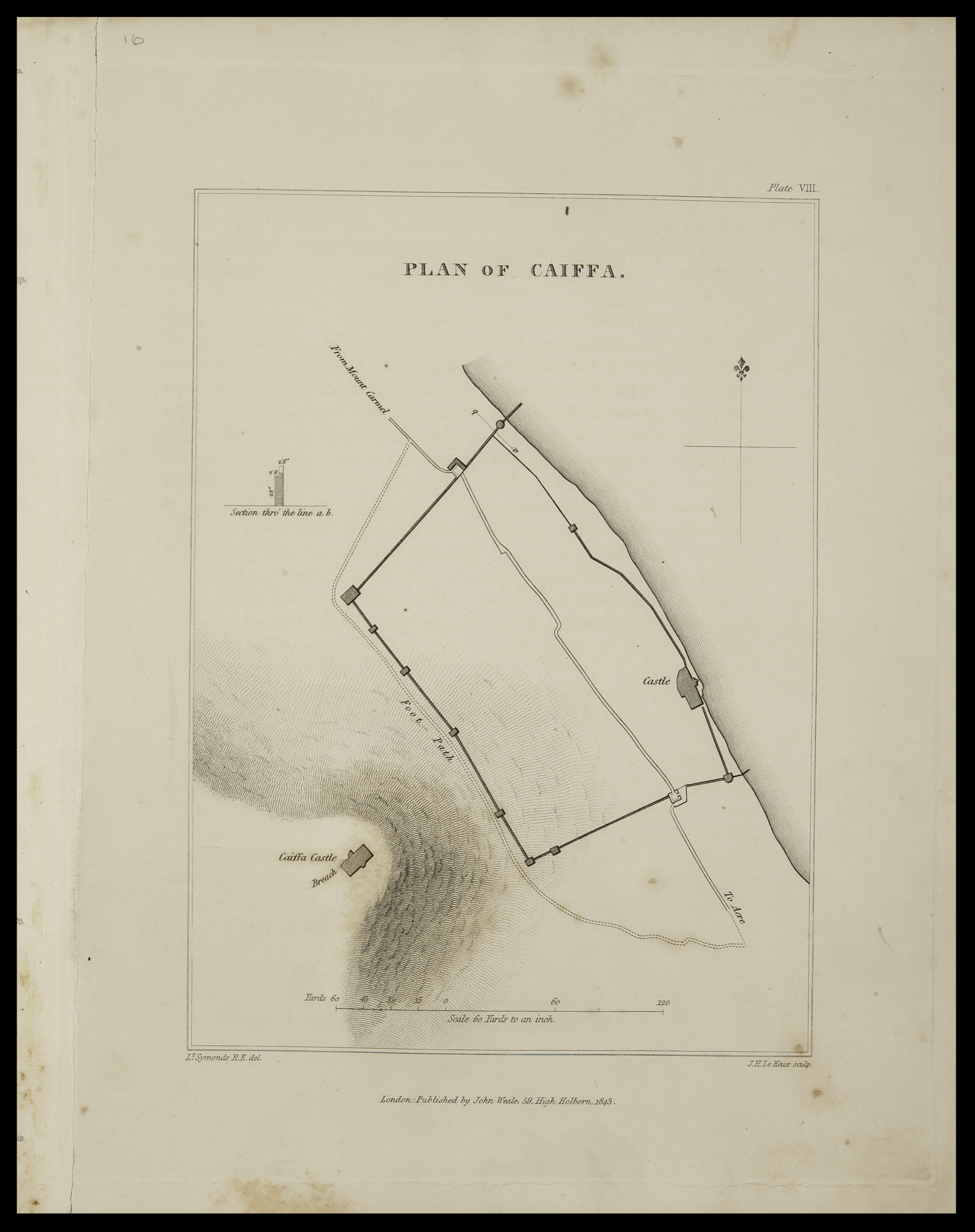
Old City of Haifa

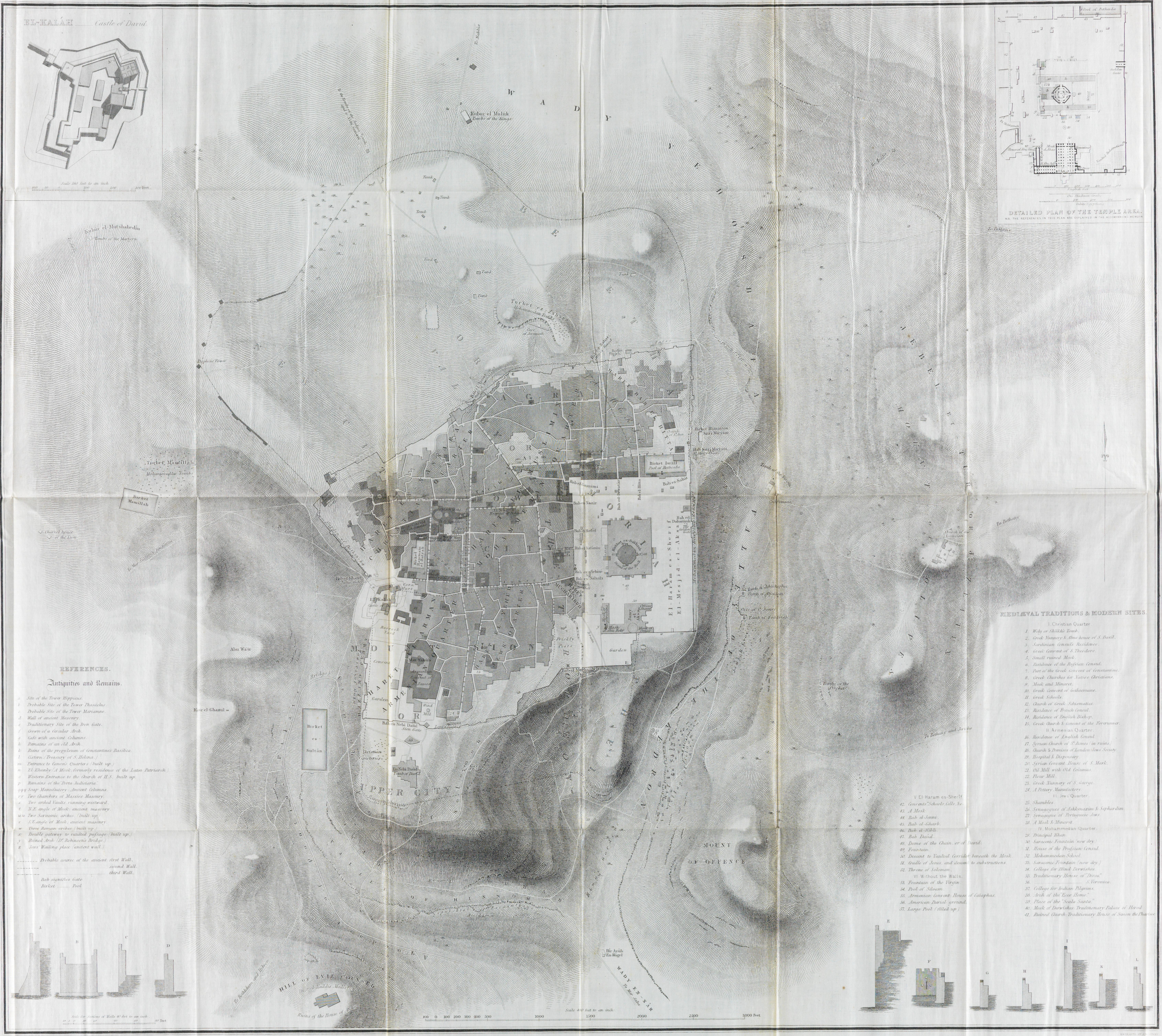
Old City of Jerusalem

== Bibliography ==
=== Primary sources ===
- Alderson, Ralph Carr (1843). "Notes on Acre and Some of the Coast Defences of Syria". Papers on subjects connected with the duties of the corps of Royal Engineers. Vol. 6.

=== Secondary sources ===
- Moscrop, John James (1 January 2000). Measuring Jerusalem: The Palestine Exploration Fund and British Interests in the Holy Land. A&C Black. ISBN 978-0-7185-0220-1.
- Chapman, Rupert, "British Archaeology and the Holy Land in the 19th Century: sources and a framework for study'", Britain and the Holy Land 1800–1914
- Goren, Haim; Faehndrich, Jutta; Schelhaas, Bruno (28 February 2017). Mapping the Holy Land: The Foundation of a Scientific Cartography of Palestine. Bloomsbury Publishing. ISBN 978-0-85772-785-5.
- Jones, Yolande (1973). "British Military Surveys of Palestine and Syria 1840-1841" (PDF). The Cartographic Journal. 10 (1): 29–41. doi:10.1179/caj.1973.10.1.29. Archived from the original (PDF) on 2019-12-26.
- British surveyors in Palestine and Syria, 1840–1841', International Cartographic Conference A Coruña 2005
- Tobler, Titus (1858). Planography of Jerusalem: memoir to accompany the new ground-plan of the city of Jerusalem and the environs, constructed anew by C.W.M. Vande Velde. Justus Perthes.
- van de Velde, Carel Willem Meredith (1858). Memoir to Accompany the Map of the Holy Land. Justus Perthes.
- Goren, Haim (2002). "Sacred, but Not Surveyed: Nineteenth-Century Surveys of Palestine". Imago Mundi. 54: 87–110. doi:10.1080/03085690208592960. JSTOR 1151507. S2CID 140702955.
- Schelhaas, Bruno; Faehndrich, Jutta; Goren, Haim (28 February 2017). Mapping the Holy Land: The Foundation of a Scientific Cartography of Palestine. Bloomsbury Publishing. ISBN 978-0-85772-785-5.
