= Church of the Holy Family, Jerusalem =

Coordinates: 31.7803°N 35.2320°E

Church of the Holy Family
- Hebrew: כנסיית המשפחה הקדושה
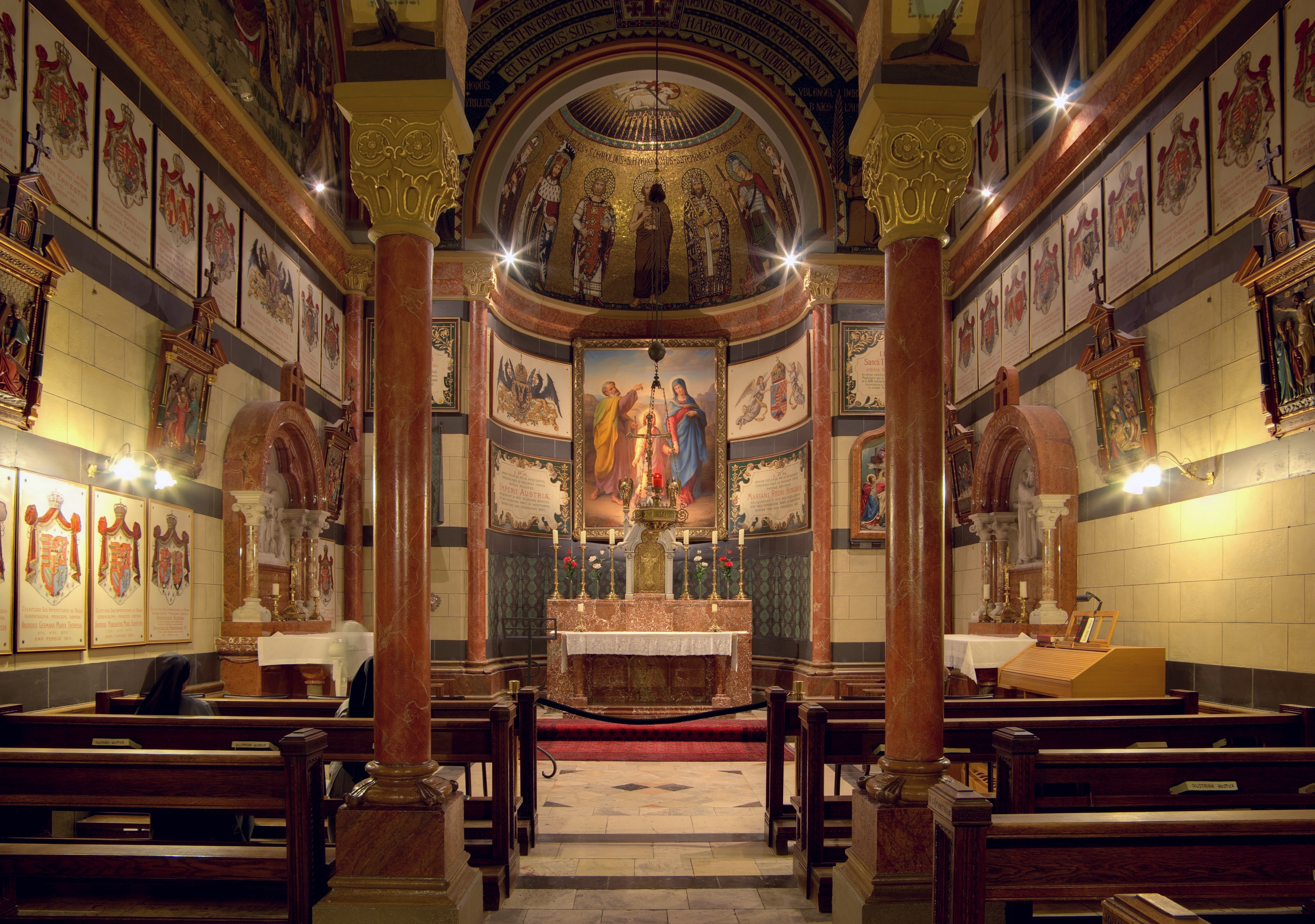
- Church of the Holy Family
- Location: Old City of Jerusalem
- Denomination: Catholic Church

The Church of the Holy Family (Hebrew: כנסיית המשפחה הקדושה, Latin: Ecclesia Sanctae Familiae, German: Kirche der Heiligen Familie), also known as the Chapel of the Holy Family, is a Catholic church building located in the Austrian Hospice in the Old City of Jerusalem.

The church building originated as a pilgrim hostel of the Catholic Church created in 1853 by the Austrians in Jerusalem (Österreichisches Hospiz zur Heiligen Familie). The chapel of the complex was ceremonially consecrated 19 March 1863 by the Latin Patriarch of Jerusalem Giuseppe Valerga and opened to pilgrims.

The liturgical organ of the chapel was built in 1910 by the Rieger organ manufacturer of Jägerndorf (now Krnov) in the Czech Republic (in 1910 in Austria-Hungary).

== See also ==
- Catholic Church in Israel
- Latin Patriarchate of Jerusalem

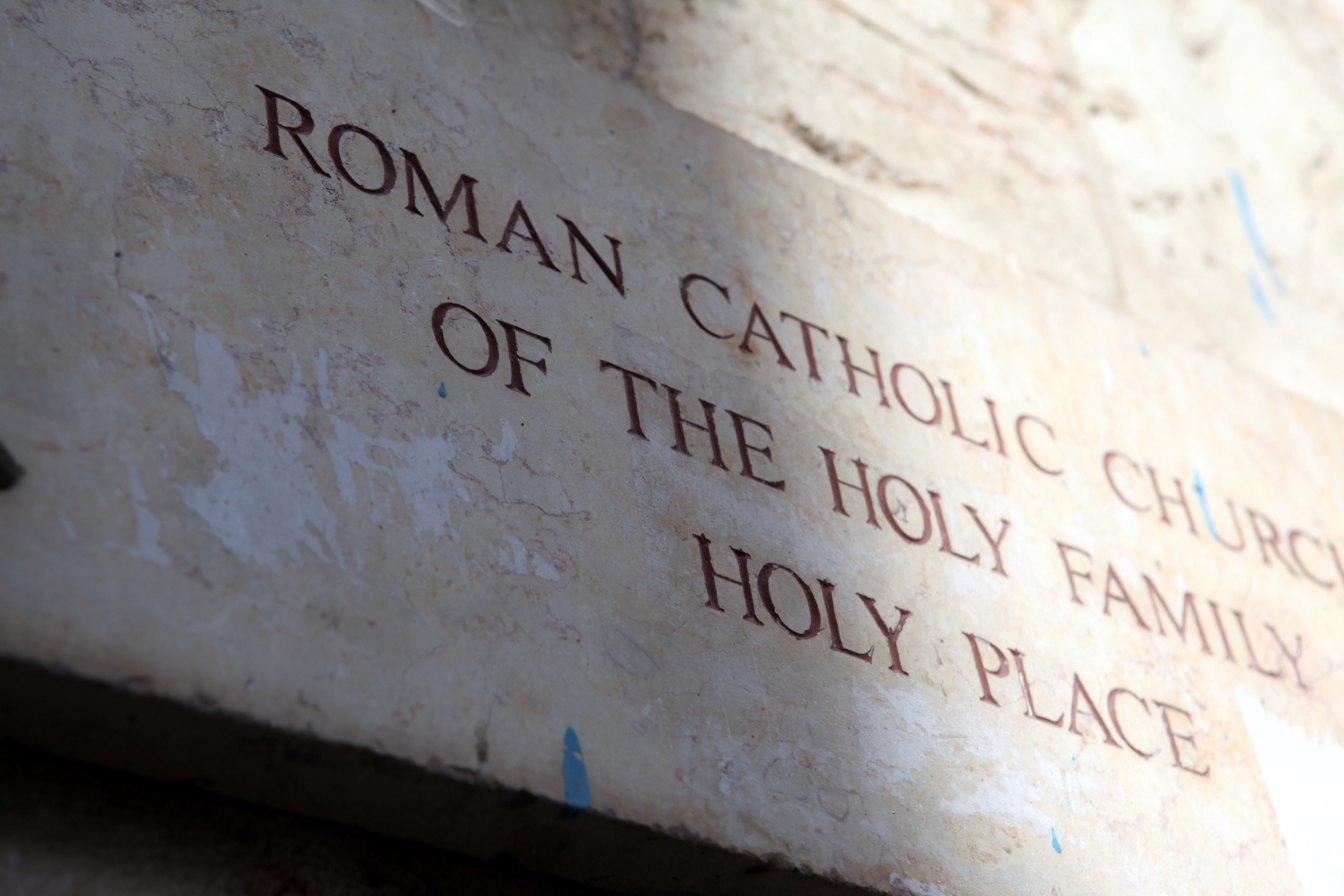
Inscription with the name of the church
