= Austrian Pilgrim Hospice to the Holy Family =

Catholic pilgrimage hostel in Jerusalem

Coordinates: 31°46′49″N 35°13′55″E

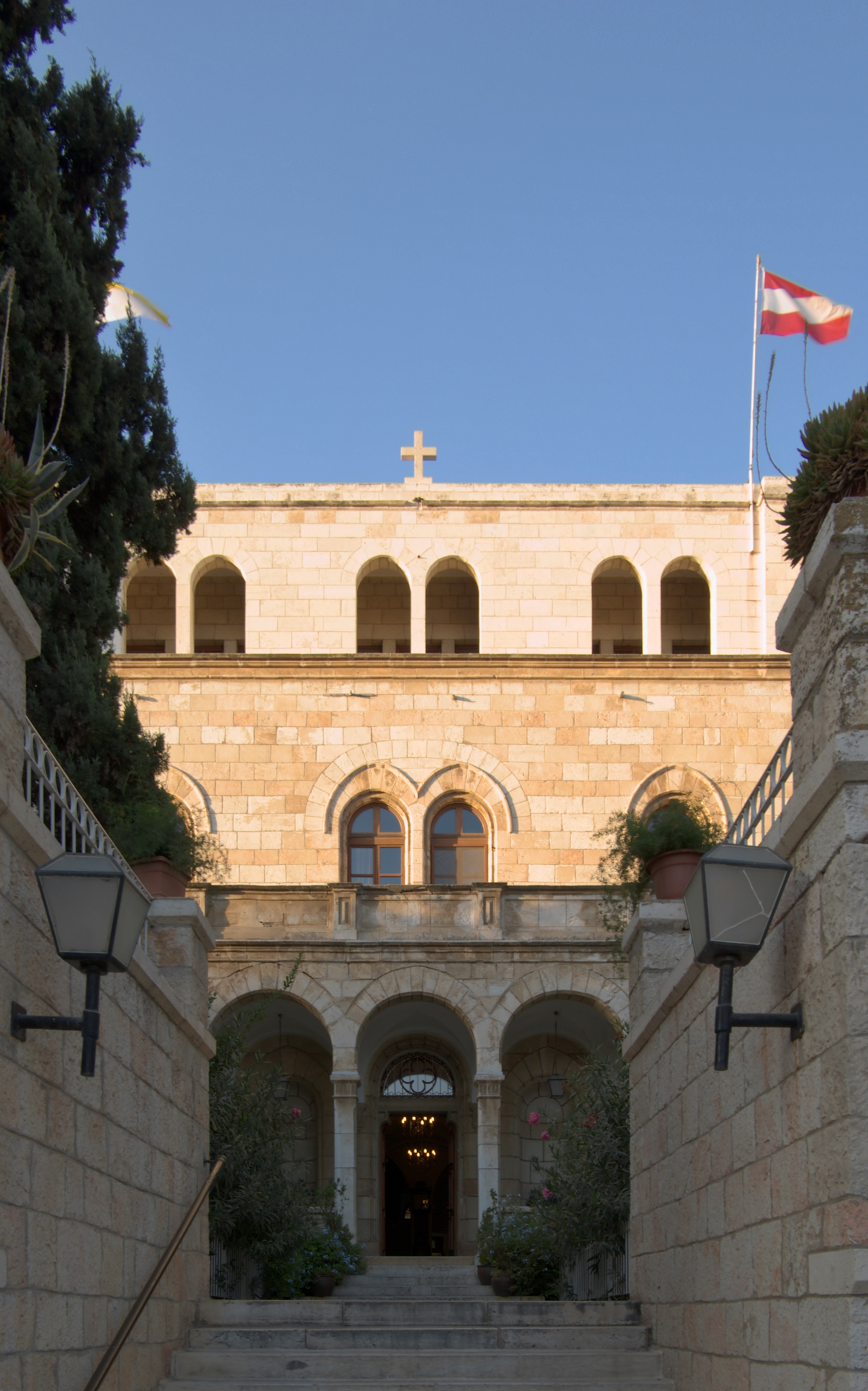
The Austrian Pilgrims Hospice to the Holy Family in Jerusalem

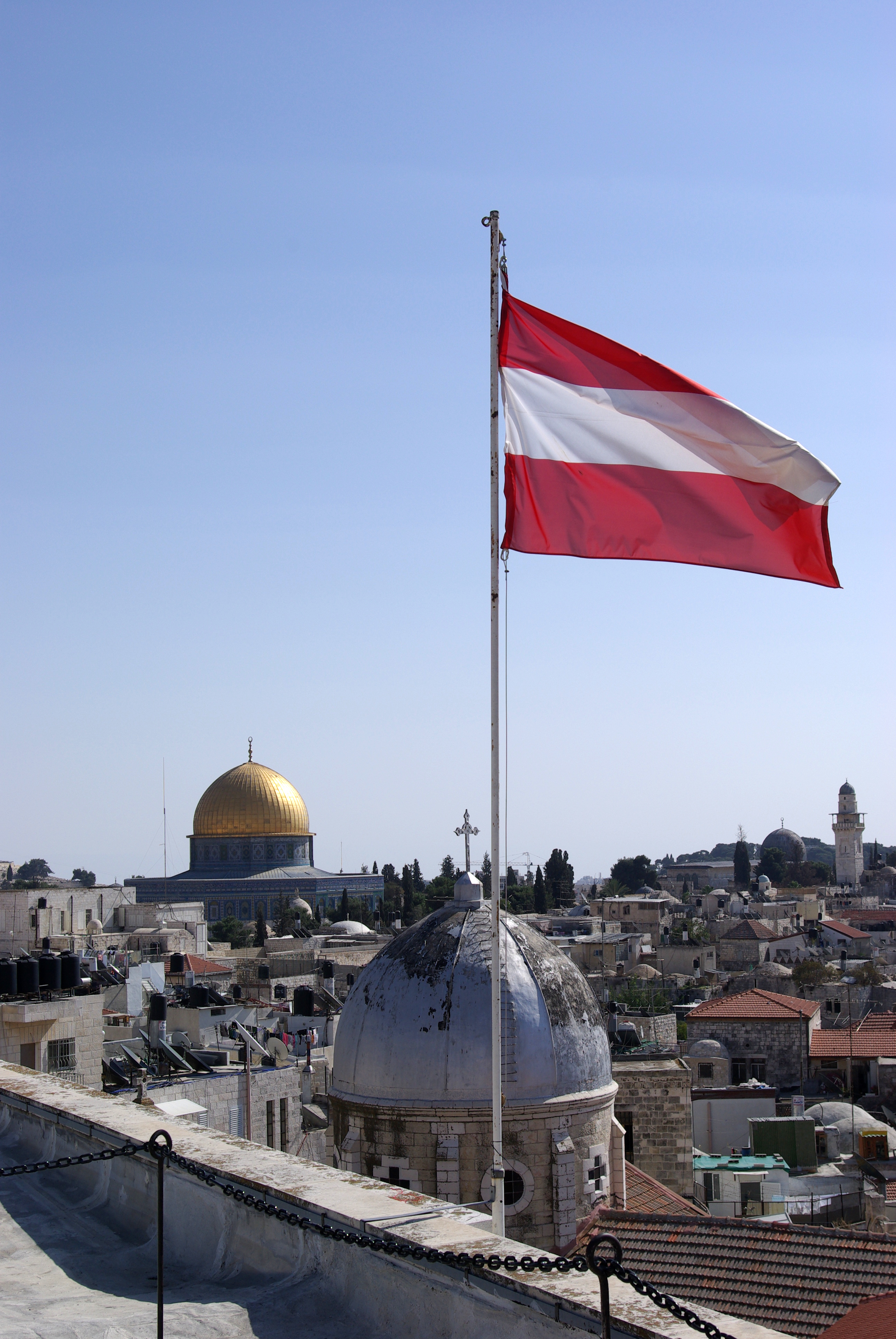
View from the rooftop terrace

The Austrian Pilgrim Hospice to the Holy Family (German: Österreichisches Pilger-Hospiz zur Heiligen Familie in Jerusalem, Hebrew: ההוספיס האוסטרי של המשפחה הקדושה, Arabic: التكية النمساوية للعائلة المقدسة) is a pilgrims hostel of the Austrian Catholic Church in the Old City of Jerusalem. It is located at the corner of Via Dolorosa and Al-Wad Street in the Muslim Quarter, at the third station of the Way of the Cross. Lucas Johannes Maier has been interim rector of the hospice since October 2024. Founded in 1856 and opened on 19 March 1863, the hospice is the oldest national pilgrim house in the Holy Land. The Church of the Holy Family is located inside the main building.

== Background ==
The interest of the major European powers in the Levant increased in the middle of the 19th century, after an alliance of Austria, Great Britain, Prussia and Russia had halted the advance of the Egyptians under Muhammad Ali Pasha and brought the Ottoman province Şam back under the control of the Sublime Porte in Istanbul. In response to the crisis in the Orient, Prussia, France, Great Britain, the Russian Tsarist Empire and the Austrian Empire began to establish the first consulates and national church institutions in the mid-1840s. Austria opened its vice-consulate on 1 May 1849. In 1852, the Austrian vice-consul Josef Graf Pizzamano proposed the construction of a pilgrims' hospital with an associated church in order to consolidate Austria's influence as a protective power for Christians in the Middle East. The then Archbishop of Vienna, Joseph Othmar von Rauscher, took up Pizzamano's idea and decided to build a pilgrims' hospice with a small infirmary for pilgrims from the regions of the monarchy.

=== Building history & foundation ===
At the beginning of 1854, the 3956 m^{2} building site on the corner of Via Dolorosa and El Wad Street in the Old City of Jerusalem was acquired by Consul Pizzamano for 5,700 gulden of Austrian currency. The first plans were submitted by the renowned architect Ermete Pierotti, but the final design and execution was handed over to the architect Anton Endlicher. He travelled to Jerusalem in November 1855 together with the foremen Josef Wenz and Johann Wiltner. At the beginning of 1856, the time-consuming earthworks caused a cost explosion. Cardinal Rauscher felt compelled to make cuts in the façade design of the house. The newly prepared construction plans were now approved and construction could begin. The construction project was financed by the Good Friday Collection and private donations. The foundation stone of the Austrian Hospice was laid on 31 December 1856. Due to various complications the foreman Josef Wenz replaced Anton Endlicher as site manager. The 20 October 1858 is the date of the laying of the keystone. The chapel of the hospice was solemnly consecrated by the Latin Patriarch Giuseppe Valerga and the pilgrims' guesthouse was opened on 19 March 1863.

=== During the Habsburg dynasty ===
The later curator Hermann Zschokke was appointed Rector of the Pilgrims' Guest House in February 1864, under him the first additions and modernisations took place. In 1868, the house management asked for help in running the housekeeping, and so in the same year two women from the monarchy arrived in Jerusalem to help.

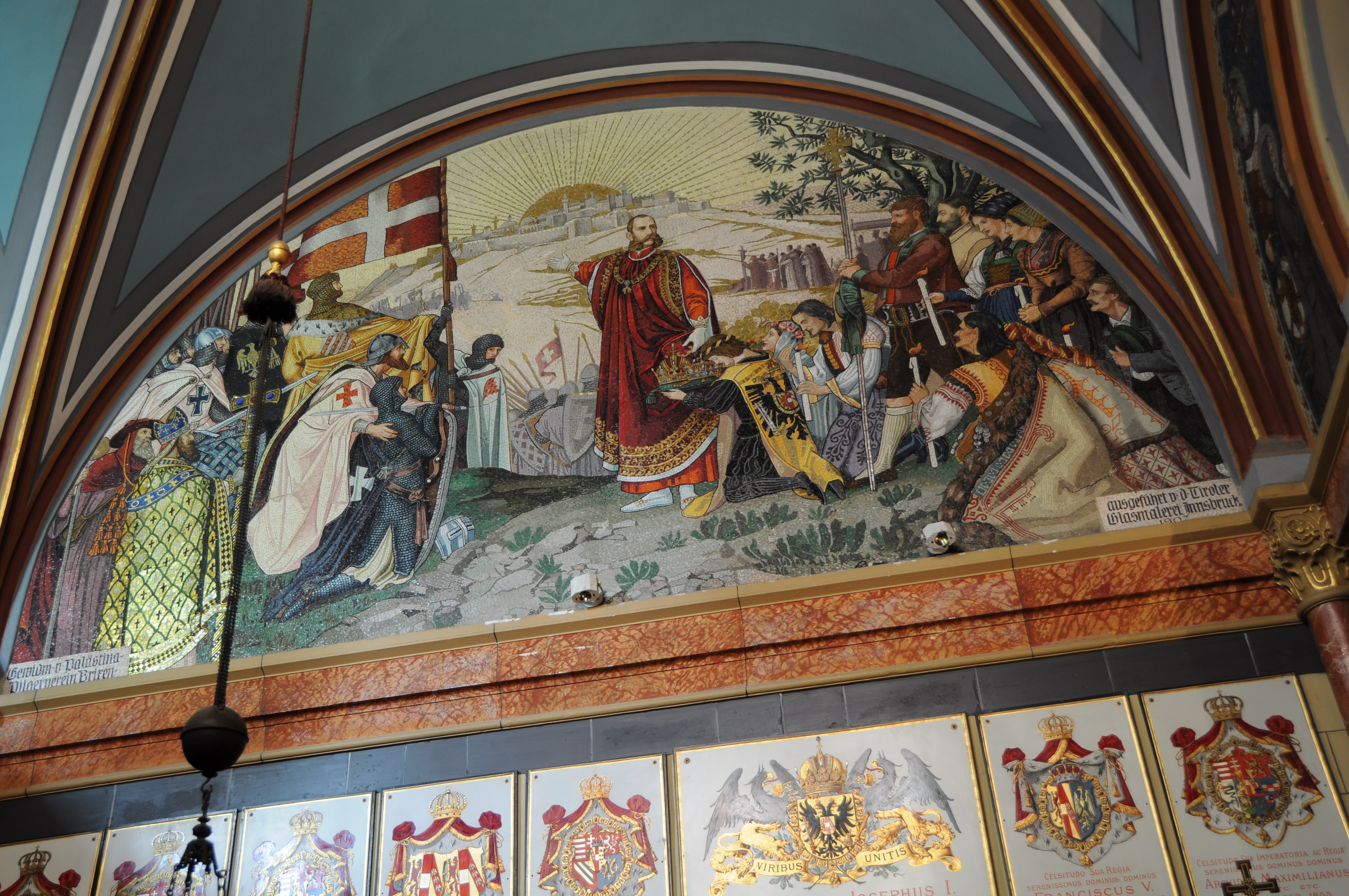
Mosaic "The warlike and peaceful pilgrimage of Austria-Hungary to the Holy Land from ancient times" in the hospice chapel

November 1869 is one of the most important dates for the popularity of popular pilgrimages at the end of the 19th century. Emperor Franz Joseph I used his trip to open the Suez Canal for a pilgrimage to the Holy Land. He was the first European monarch to visit the Holy Land since the end of the Crusader Empire. This visit was a highly symbolic model for the following generations of pilgrims from the monarchy.

In 1895, the curator of the House of Prelate Hermann Zschokke advocated a structural restructuring and modernisation, as the character of pilgrimages had changed fundamentally towards the end of the 19th century. In order to include the Hungarian half of the Imperial and Royal Empire Monarchy, the Hungarian Stephan Csarszky was appointed as Vice-Rector and the house was renamed the Austro-Hungarian Pilgrims' House of the Holy Family. Four sisters of the Congregation of St. Charles Borromeo, together with a Viennese gardener, arrived in the summer of 1896 to take charge of the kitchen and the laundry. In 1898 over 500 participants set out on the First Tyrolean People's Pilgrimage under Colonel (ret.) Heinrich Himmel from Agisburg to the Holy Land.

In 1902, the number of guest beds was increased to 100 and the terrace was added, and in order to offer the sisters a retreat, the foundation stone for the sisters' house was laid in 1903 and construction was completed in 1904.

In 1908, in the 60th anniversary year of Emperor Franz Joseph's accession to the throne, work began on the renovation of the chapel. This extension included the two side altars of the Teutonic Order of Knights, a mosaic of the most prominent saints of the Crown Lands in the dome of the apse, new confessionals and pews and a new sacristy. This work lasted until 1910. In 1913 the rector Franz Fellinger, who had already been in office from 1900 to 1906, became rector of the house again.

=== Hospice during the First World War ===
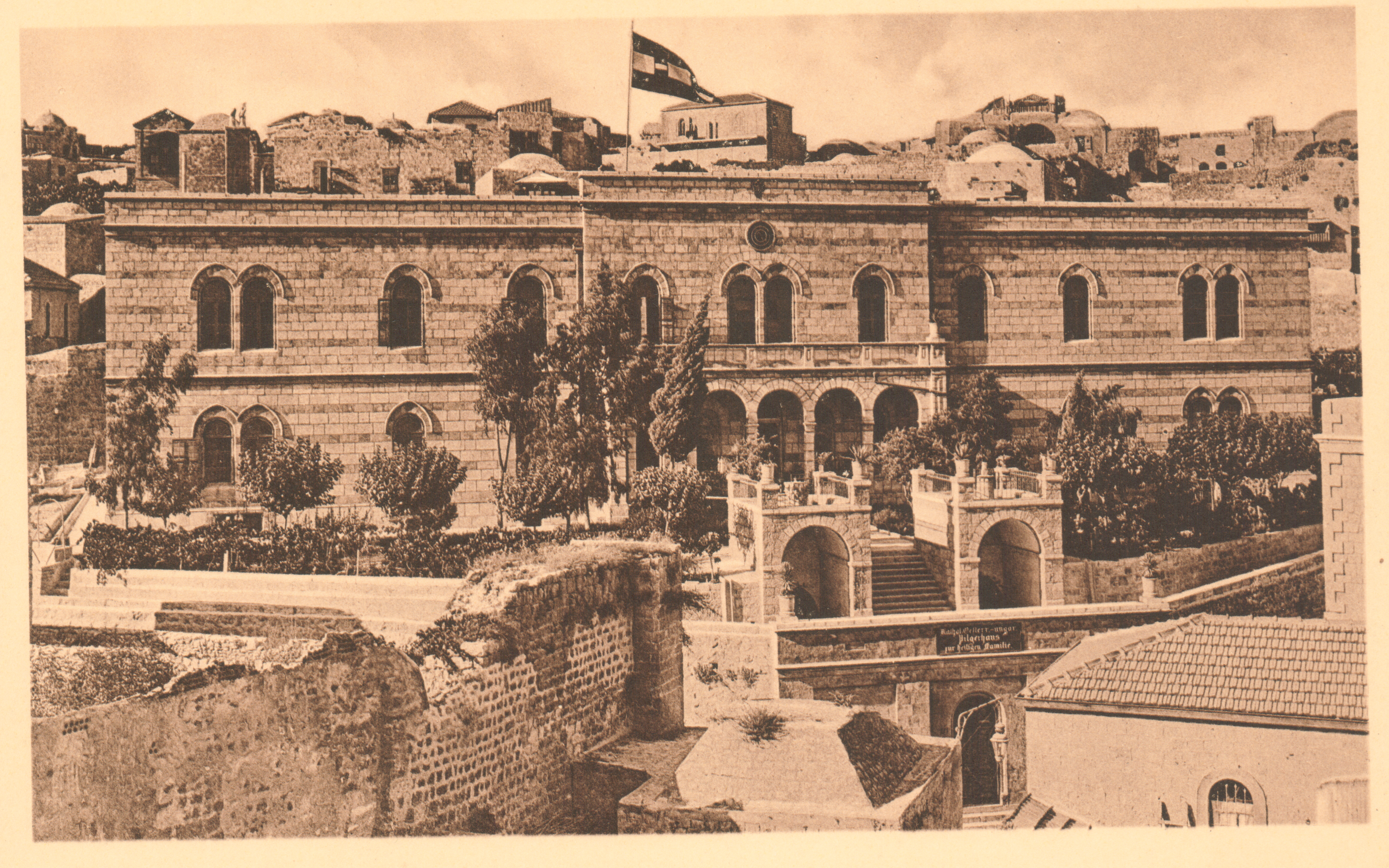
Postcard with frontal view of the hospice, late 19th century

The Ottoman Empire entered the First World War on the side of the Four League. In the course of the mobilisation phase, on 9 September 1914, the capitulations for the members of the Entente were dissolved and the ecclesiastical institutions of the now enemy nations were requisitioned.

When the Sultan declared Jihad against the British in November 1914, all citizens of the Entente, including the clergy, had to leave Jerusalem. During this time, there was a depressed and hostile atmosphere in the city. General Ulrich Back became city commander and the Austrian Hospice enjoyed increasing popularity as a meeting place for German and Austro-Hungarian military personnel.

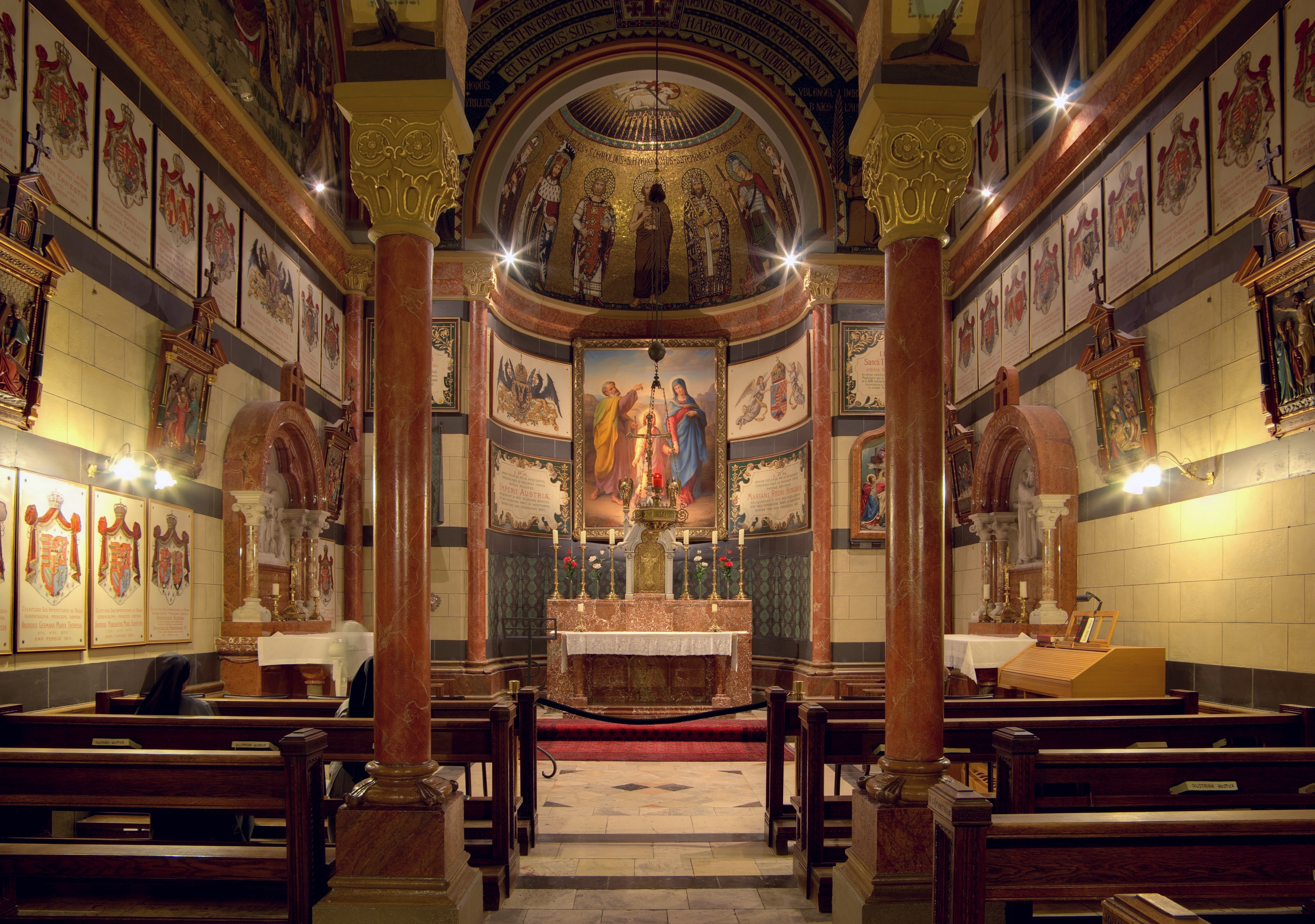
The hospice chapel

The Ottoman troops did not succeed in pushing back the British in Egypt and in 1915 British units advanced into the Sandjak of Jerusalem.

To prevent the danger of requisition, the hospice was officially converted into a convalescent home for officers and soldiers in February 1916. The two battery strong mountain howitzer division "von Marno", which was sent to support them, moved into Jerusalem in May 1916. Since Jerusalem had already become an immediate combat zone in November 1917, the Austro-Hungarian consular and military officials evacuated the city, only Rector Fellinger and the sisters remained in the hospice to protect it from looting.

On 11 December 1917 General Edmund Allenby took over Jerusalem without a fight. The Austrian Hospice was requisitioned by the British administration on 16 February 1918 and converted into an Anglican orphanage for Syrian Christian children.

=== British Mandate Period ===
On 29 August 1919 the orphanage was dissolved and the building was returned to the board of trustees on the same day. Rector Franz Fellinger immediately took over the management of the house again. After a sighting and subsequent compensation by the British administration, the cleaning, disinfection and repair work on the hospice began at the end of October.

In order to maintain the hospice during the post-war years, it was converted into a pension for British officers and administrative officials. With this income the house was completely electrified in 1923. Many successor states of the Danube Monarchy claimed ownership of the hospice, but it remained in the possession of the Archdiocese of Vienna. However, the word "Austrian" was taken out of the name in 1924 and Czechoslovaks as well as Hungarians and Slovenes were given a seat on the board of trustees.

The board of trustees approved the plans for an urgently needed addition in January 1931, hiring Vienna-born Gottlieb Bäuerle as master builder. The work began in the winter of 1932 and ended one year later. The attractiveness of the house was increased by the new roof terrace.

In 1935 Franz Haider was appointed rector. In mid-April 1936 the Arab uprising against the British Mandate broke out. The streams of visitors came to a standstill. On 18 May 1936, the Viennese servant Karl Breitlinger was shot in the back because he was mistaken for an insurgent. The conflict slowly ebbed away and in 1937 498 guests stayed overnight in the hospice. After the Anschluss in 1938, the legal status of the Austrian Hospice was unclear. As a result, the pilgrims' house remained an independent church institution in the meantime. The Third Reich immediately cast an eye on the hospice and its special position in the Middle East, they first tried to exert pressure on the rector by freezing the salary payments. Withstanding the pressure from Berlin, Cardinal Theodor Innitzer stated that the Austrian Hospice was a purely ecclesiastical institution and could only be transferred by decision of the Board of Trustees, in which all dioceses of the former Habsburg Empire were represented, which was not possible for political reasons alone.

Immediately after the declaration of war by Great Britain in 1939, the hospice was confiscated by the British mandate power and Rector Franz Haider was interned for five days. His rapid release was due to the intervention of Franz Fellinger. The house was converted into an internment camp for German and Italian clergymen. Auxiliary Bishop Fellinger obtained permission for the five sisters of Vöcklabruck to stay in the pilgrims' house and to manage the household. Before Christmas, most of the 29 internees were released from the hospice and given limited freedom of movement. Only for Rector Haider and the Lazarist priest Leo Schmitt the internment remained.

On 8 March 1940 Haider was transferred to an internment camp in Akko, and he handed over the management of the house to the sisters who remained in the house. In May there was again the internment of clergymen of the Axis powers. The 80 internees, including 23 lay people, were transferred to a Franciscan monastery on 28 June to make room for 170 English women and children from Egypt. As early as January 1941 the British refugees left the hospice and the sisters were allowed to enter the house again. In order to ascertain the possible damage, Franz Haider was brought to Jerusalem from the internment camp in Haifa, where he had been transferred in the meantime. Afterwards the pilgrims' house was converted into a camp for 150 nuns from the German Reich. The German director of the Schmidt School, Father Johannes Sonnen, served as rector during this time.

In July 1943 the internment camp was closed down and all sisters who had been interned up to that point were allowed to return to their convents.

In May 1944, the British Army decided to establish an officer's school in the house, whose teaching staff included Abba Eban, later Israel's Foreign Minister. The sisters continued to run the kitchen and the household. Rector Franz Haider was not granted permission to return to the Palestinian mandated area.

The officers' school was finally closed in September 1947 and converted into a British police station.

On 6 January 1948 the British withdrew from the Old City of Jerusalem and the official return of the Pilgrims' Guest House to Father Sonnen took place on 22 April 1948, but the house was under the administration of the Red Cross, under whose supervision a military hospital was established. On 1 May 1948 the first patients were transferred to the hospice.

=== Jordanian administration ===
During the 1947–1949 Palestine war, the Austrian Hospice was used as a field hospital; on 10 June 1948, a grenade hit the balcony and killed a nurse and four patients. At that time the administration was in the hands of the Red Cross and the Transjordanian administration. The Austrian nuns of the Order actively helped with the care of the sick. After the armistice of 3 April 1949 between Transjordan and Israel, the hospice was located in the Transjordanian-occupied part.

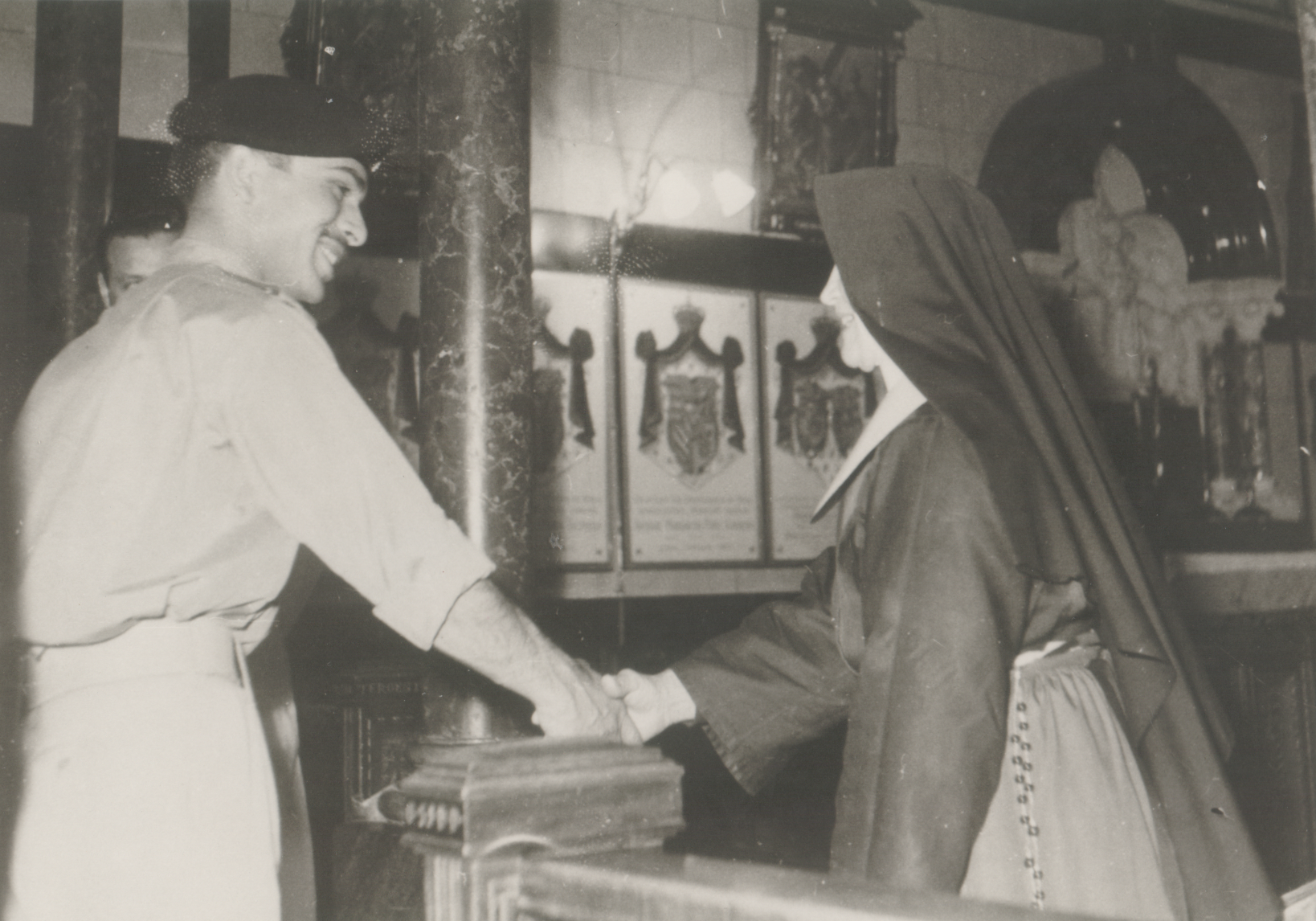
King Hussein of Jordan and Sister Liliosa Fasching, 1961

Repair work began in 1951 and on 20 July of that year King Abdullah I of Jordan was the victim of a gun battle. He was admitted to the Austrian Hospice. Sister Liliosa Fasching excelled in emergency care, but the king died of his injuries.

In 1953 a provisional three-year lease was signed between the Transjordanian government and the Archdiocese of Vienna to use the hospice as a hospital.

The already very sickly rector Franz Haider returned to Vienna on 15 March 1954, the Vöcklabruck sisters remained true to their task and maintained Austrian influence. However, Franz Haider remained the official rector of the hospice.

In 1961, the Palestinian-Christian trustee of the house, Antoine F. Albina, extended the contract with the Jordanian government on behalf of Rector Franz Haider.

In 1966, when the government in Amman was willing to hold talks on the dissolution of the hospital in the Austrian Hospice, Franz Sauer was appointed new Rector by the Board of Trustees.

Hopes for restitution vanished when the Six Day War broke out on 5 June 1967 and the hospice was once again converted into a war hospital. The Israeli army conquered the Old City; the future of the pilgrims' hospice was once again uncertain.

=== Return and reopening ===
It was hoped for a restitution at the beginning of 1970, but the treatment of the pilgrim house, since it is located in the part of the city that is disputed under international law, was a precedent for both sides. If rent were demanded from the Israelis, the annexed Old City would be recognized as part of Israel. For the Catholic Church of Austria this meant that the hospital had to continue to exist and to receive the rent from the Jordanian side. Although the house was officially no longer a pilgrims' house for a long time, Rector Franz Sauer organized pilgrimages time and again and also led them to the hospice.

In 1980, the Israeli Ministry of Health dismissed 24 hospital employees, against which the Arab population protested vehemently. There were demonstrations, strikes and media campaigns. The Arab administration wanted to develop the hospice into a modern hospital, but Rector Sauer made it clear to them that it could not continue as a hospital in the long term.

At Christmas 1984, Rector Franz Sauer suffered a fit of weakness and was subsequently assigned Manfred Kniewasser as Vice Rector.

Due to budget cuts by the Israeli Ministry of Health, the hospice was to be closed on 31 July 1985. In order not to risk incidents, the Israeli executive decided to evacuate the hospital two days earlier. There was a general strike by the Arab population.

In the meantime, the hospice stood empty and was guarded by a private security company. In December 1985 the two lawyers Julius Schuster and Franz Eckert took over the sealed building for the board of trustees. On 21 December, the first Mass was celebrated in the house chapel and towards the end of the month the first group of pilgrims arrived in the house.

At the beginning of January 1987 the general renovation began. The majority of the construction workers and the master builders were Arabs. The entire house was modernized and the generous frescoes in the salon were uncovered and renovated.

In February 1988 most of the house was restored and on 19 March, the 125th anniversary of the inauguration of the hospice chapel, the house was solemnly opened. The newly appointed rector was Wolfgang Schwarz. Altogether the employees of the hospice consisted of three sisters from the Congregatio Jesu, five Arabic co-workers and some Austrian volunteers.

On 7 January 1991, the accommodation was officially closed due to the beginning of the war in Iraq. However, the situation eased again just one month later. Sister Glasauer returned to Austria and with the theologian Johann Krammer, a layman became assistant to the rector for the first time.

== Present ==
The years of the Second Intifada from 2000 to 2005 brought heavy losses, and the guest house occupancy rate was often below 20%. In these years the Austrian dioceses doubled the collection results from the Palmsonntagskollekte in order to be able to keep "their house in the Orient" open.

In May 2004 the diocesan priest Markus Stephan Bugnyár from Burgenland took over the task as rector of the hospice; at that time he had already studied biblical sciences for several semesters in Jerusalem at the École biblique et archéologique française de Jérusalem and thus qualified for this task in biblically founded pastoral ministry for pilgrims.

Sister Bernadette Schwarz from Upper Austria took over as head of housekeeping in 2008. Since September 2011 she has been Vice-Rector - the first woman in the history of the house. At the end of August 2019, she resigned from office.

Since 2004, the building has undergone a profound change in stages, both in terms of its structure and content. In order to guarantee a continuous guest house operation, the individual measures are divided into individual projects. Historically significant for the completion of the hospice was the construction of Casa Austria: In April 2019, this new wing in the north-eastern area of the property on the Via Dolorosa was opened, with which the pilgrims' hostel now attains the size that was already intended in 1863. Currently the house has 45 rooms and 5 dormitories.

Since 1 July 2018 the Austrian Hospice in Jerusalem officially bears the epithet 'pilgrim' and is now called "Austrian Pilgrim's Hospice to the Holy Family in Jerusalem".

The Viennese coffee house has been successively expanded and since 2019 it has borne the name "Café Trieste": in memory of the starting point of the first pilgrimages from the seaport of the former imperial and royal family. City of Trieste. Since 2018, the building management has been dealing with the upcoming general refurbishment of the historical building fabric in the main building, which is expected to be completed in 2025.

As a decidedly Austrian institution, the pilgrims' hospice today still has the task of offering Central European hospitality to the pilgrims' guests at the Holy Places. As a cultural and educational institution, the "Academy Austrian Hospice" serves the intercultural encounter between Christianity, Judaism and Islam in the form of lectures, exhibitions, publications and concerts.

As a church institution, the hospice assumes social responsibility: by creating jobs and supporting needy children and young people in education and training as well as young families. Special attention is paid to the Catholic parish "Zur Heiligen Familie" in Gaza City, which was founded as a mission station by the South Tyrolean priest Vice-Rector Georg Gatt in 1887.

Since the beginning of the 1990s, it has also been possible to do alternative military service in the hospice, since 1 January 2016 in accordance with the new Voluntary Service Act. The Rector Markus St. Bugnyár is the spiritual councilor of the Order of St. George.

== List of hospice rectors ==
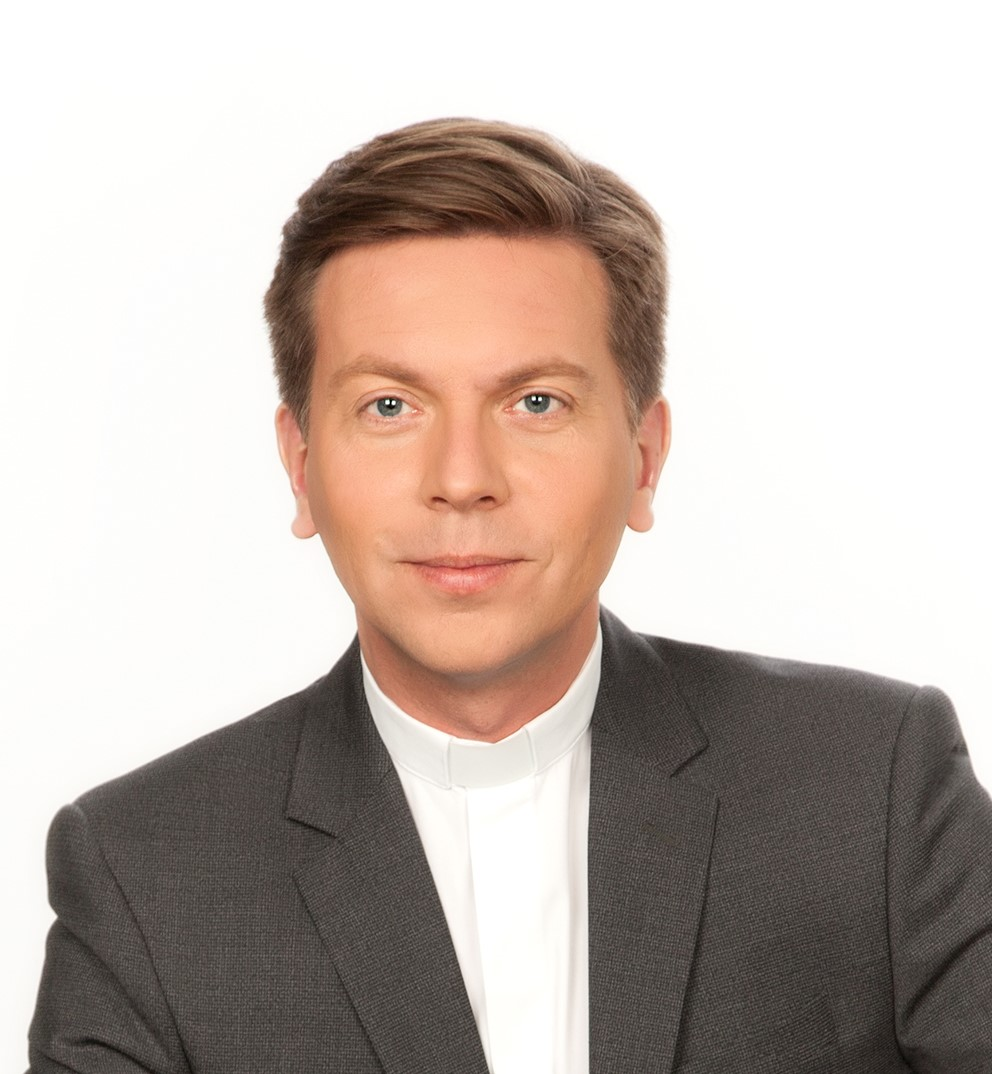
Rector Markus St. Bugnyár

| Name | Origin | Time span |
|---|---|---|
| Eduard Kröll | Brünn | 1863–1864 |
| Hermann Zschokke | Böhm. Leipa | 1864–1866 |
| Albert v. Hörmann | Bregenz | 1866–1867 |
| Anton Wecera | Mähren | 1867–1868 |
| Franz Horvath | Krain | 1868–1870 |
| Stephan Rosenberger | Wien | 1870–1871 |
| Ignaz Fischer | Königgrätz | 1871–1873 |
| Karl Schnabl | Wien | 1873–1876 |
| Johann Fahrngruber | St. Pölten | 1876–1879 |
| P. Franz Josef Costa-Major | Tirol | 1879–1892 |
| Richard Joch | Mährisch Weißkirchen | 1893–1895 |
| Franz Malecek | Prag | 1895–1897 |
| Stephan Csarszky | Gran | 1897–1902 |
| Franz Fellinger | Linz | 1902–1906 |
| Martin Ehrlich | Gurk | 1906–1910 |
| Leopold Dangelmajer | Gran | 1910–1911 |
| Jakob André | Salzburg | 1911–1913 |
| Franz Fellinger | Linz | 1913–1935 |
| Franz Haider | Wien | 1935–1954 |
| Ernst Bannert | Burgenland | 1964–1966 |
| Franz Sauer | Graz | 1966–1987 |
| Wolfgang Schwarz | Wien | 1987–2004 |
| Markus St. Bugnyár | Burgenland | 2004-2024 |
| Lucas Maier | Leoben, Steiermark | since 2024 |

== Bibliography ==
- Helmut Wohnout: Geschichte des österreichischen Hospizes in Jerusalem. Norka, Klosterneuburg 1993.
- Markus Stefan Bugnyar und Helmut Wohnout (Hrsg.): Im Orient zu Hause. Das Österreichische Hospiz in Jerusalem. Verlag Geschichte & Kunst, Wien 2015, ISBN 978-3-903076-00-6.
- Helmut Wohnout: Das österreichische Hospiz in Jerusalem. Geschichte des Pilgerhauses an der Via Dolorosa. Böhlau, Wien u. a. 2000, ISBN 3-205-99095-1 (Excerpts from the book ).
