= Georg Gatt =

Georg Gatt (1843–1924) was a Tyrolean Roman Catholic priest and missionary, best known for establishing a parish and several institutions in Gaza, and his association with the Austrian Pilgrim Hospice to the Holy Family in Jerusalem, during the late 19th century.

== Early life ==
Born in Nörsach, Austria, Gatt was ordained as a priest in 1867 in Brixen im Thale. He was appointed Vice-Rector of the Austrian Hospice in Jerusalem in 1871 by Joseph Othmar von Rauscher. In 1873 he became the headmaster of a boys' school in Jerusalem.

== Gaza ==
In 1879 Gatt moved to Gaza City, where he founded the Catholic parish "Zur Heiligen Familie" in 1887, focusing on pastoral care rather than proselytizing.

Following a fundraising journey back to Austria, he purchased land in Gaza, where he built a large house, established a school, and endowed a chapel. He became a partner in two grain-steam mills located in Gaza and Ashdod, using the profits to support the local Austrian community and fund his ongoing work.

In 1887, he published a detailed map of the city.

After 30 years in Gaza, he returned to the Austrian Hospice in Jerusalem, where he died in 1924.

== Bibliography ==
- Sauer, Franz (1983). Georg Gatt, Missionar in Gaza: 1843 - 1924. Miscellanea / Neue Reihe. na.
- Austrian Hospice (2014), Austrian Hospice News, Number 14 (PDF)
