= Chapel of the Milk Grotto =

Church in Bethlehem, West Bank, Palestine

Chapel of the Milk Grotto of Our Lady
- Grotto of Our Lady; Milk Grotto
- Arabic: كنيسة غار الحليب
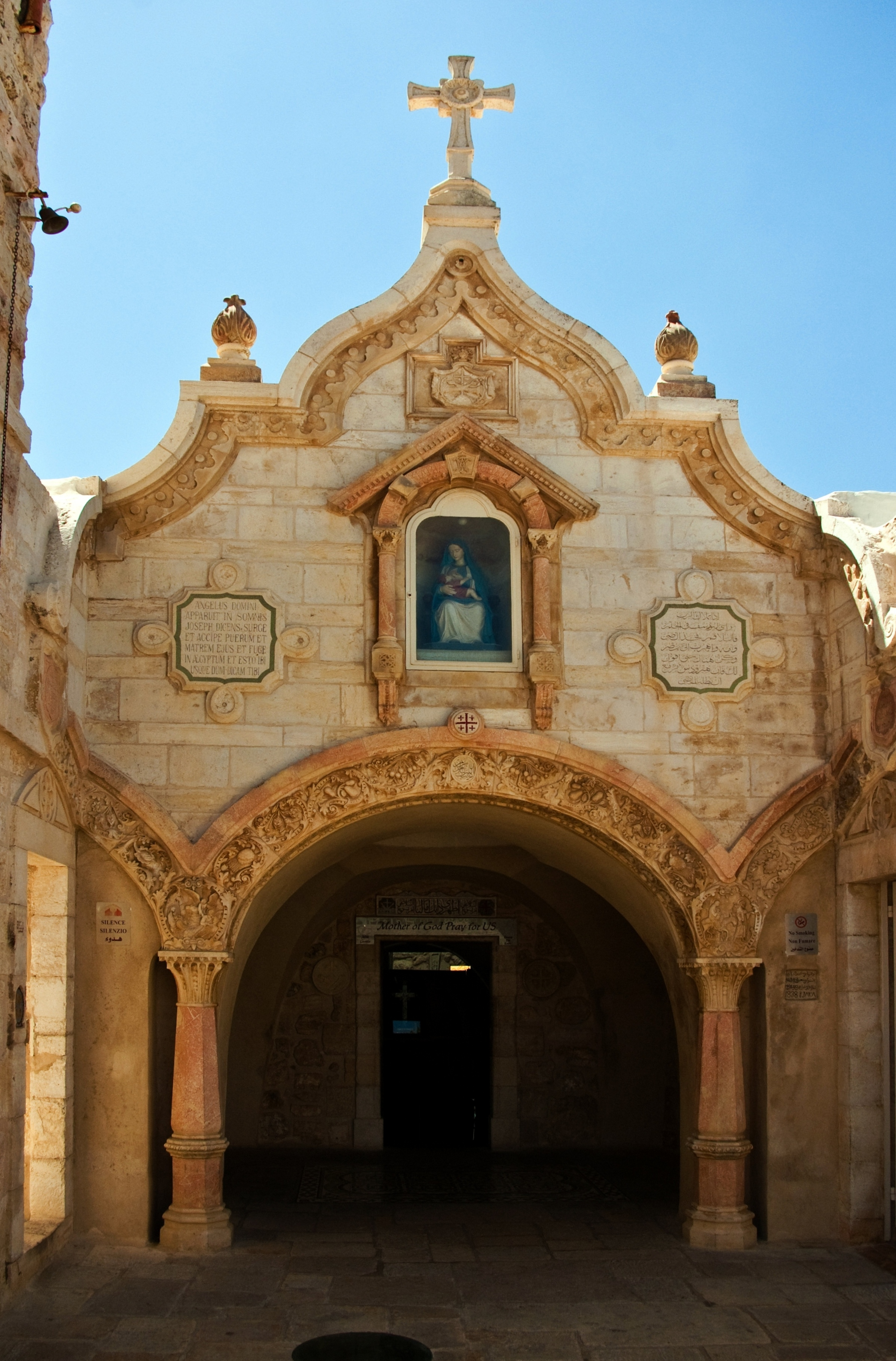
- Chapel of the Milk Grotto

- Location within the West Bank Location within State of Palestine
- 31°42′12.4″N 35°12′31.6″E
- Location: Bethlehem
- Country: State of Palestine
- Denomination: Catholic Church

Architecture
- Completed: 1872

Administration
- Province: Custody of the Holy Land

The Chapel of the Milk Grotto of Our Lady (Latin: Crypta lactea; Arabic: كنيسة غار الحليب, romanized: Kanīsat ḡār Al-ḥalīb), also called Grotto of Our Lady or Milk Grotto, is a Catholic chapel in Bethlehem, in the West Bank, erected in 1872. Since Byzantine times, the place has been a center of Christian pilgrimage, maintained since its last erection together with its Marian shrine and monastery by the Custody of the Holy Land of the Order of the Friars Minor of the Catholic Church in Palestine. The Status Quo, a 250-year-old understanding between religious communities, applies to the site.

== History ==
The current Catholic chapel was built in 1872 on the site of a former Byzantine church from around the 5th century, of which only part of the mosaic floor remains.

== Significance ==
According to Christian tradition, it is the place where the Holy Family found refuge during the Massacre of the Innocents, before they could flee to Egypt. The name is derived from the story that a "drop of milk" of the Virgin Mary fell on the floor of the cave and changed its colour to white.

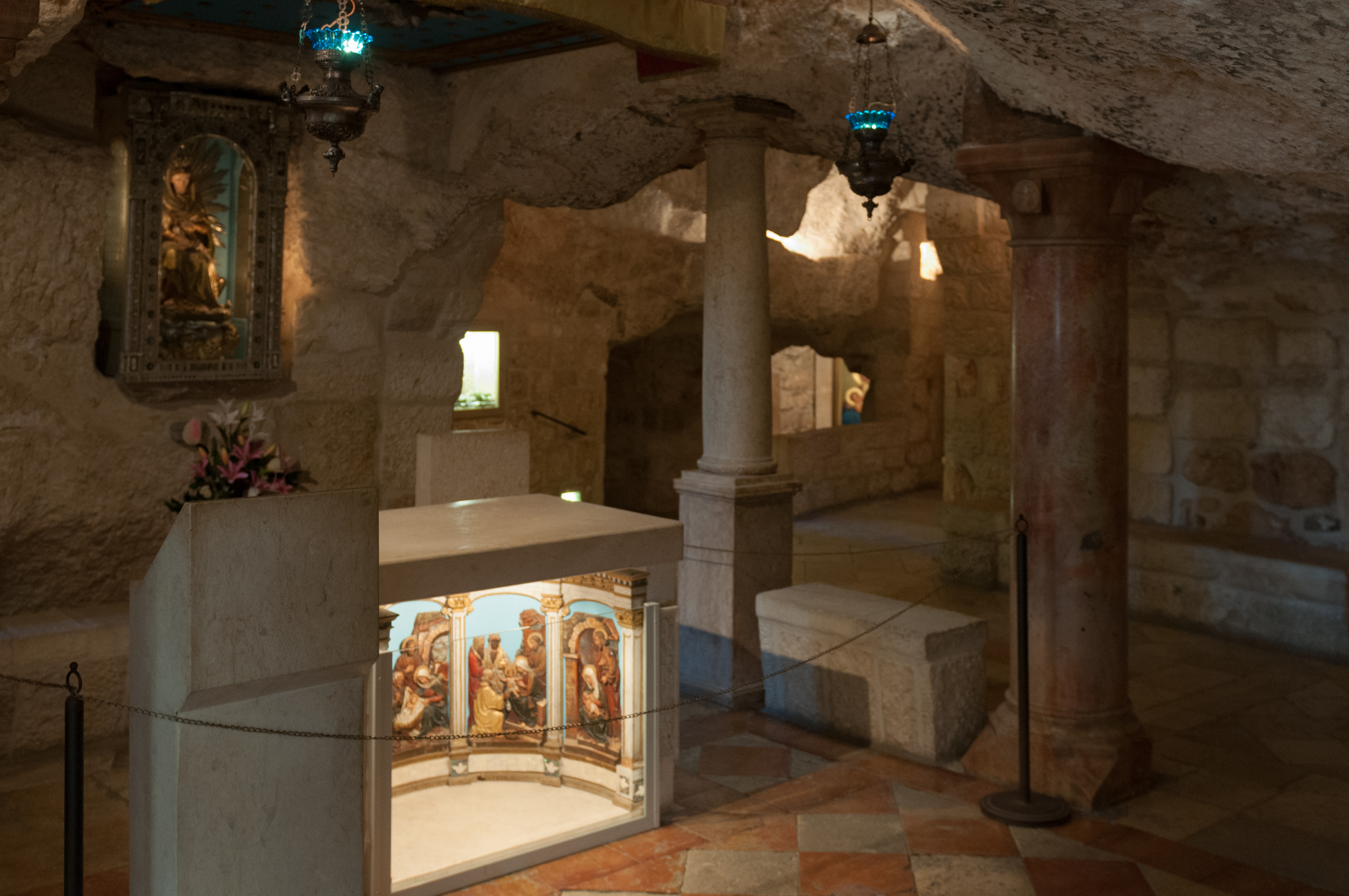
Internal view

The space, which contains three different caves, is visited by some in hope of healing infertile couples, the shrine allegedly being a place where prayers for children are miraculously answered.

== Monastery of the Perpetual Adoration of the Blessed Sacrament ==
A monastery of the Sisters of Perpetual Adoration of the Blessed Sacrament is attached to the chapel. The red-and-white clad nuns practice perpetual Eucharistic adoration, and have uninterruptedly been praying for peace since 2016, when a "Queen of Peace" tabernacle was installed in their Adoration Chapel.

The tabernacle was donated by the Polish community "Queen of Peace" to the Franciscan Custody of the Holy Land. Originally designed for the Fourth Station of the Via Dolorosa in Jerusalem, it was eventually moved to the Milk Grotto in 2016, because the nuns were better suited to ensure continuous prayer for peace.

The Polish artist who designed the tabernacle, Mariusz Drapikowski, explains his work as inspired by the Apocalypse of Saint John: the closed tabernacle depicts the earthly Jerusalem, with the Twelve Apostles and Twelve Tribes of Israel surrounding the Crucified Jesus; when open, the tabernacle represents the Heavenly Jerusalem, brightly shining and flanked by a pair of olive trees symbolising the Two Witnesses (Revelation 11). Their branches are filled with a variety of different crosses, symbolising the various Christian professions emerging from the common trunk of Christianity. At the centre of the open shrine is the monstrance showing a Madonna holding in her hands the lunette for the Eucharistic Christ.

== See also ==
- Church of St. Catherine, Bethlehem
- Shepherd's Field Chapel, Bethlehem
