= Chapel of the Shepherds' Field =

Church in Bethlehem, West Bank, Palestine

Shepherds' Field Chapel
- Sanctuary Gloria in excelsis Deo
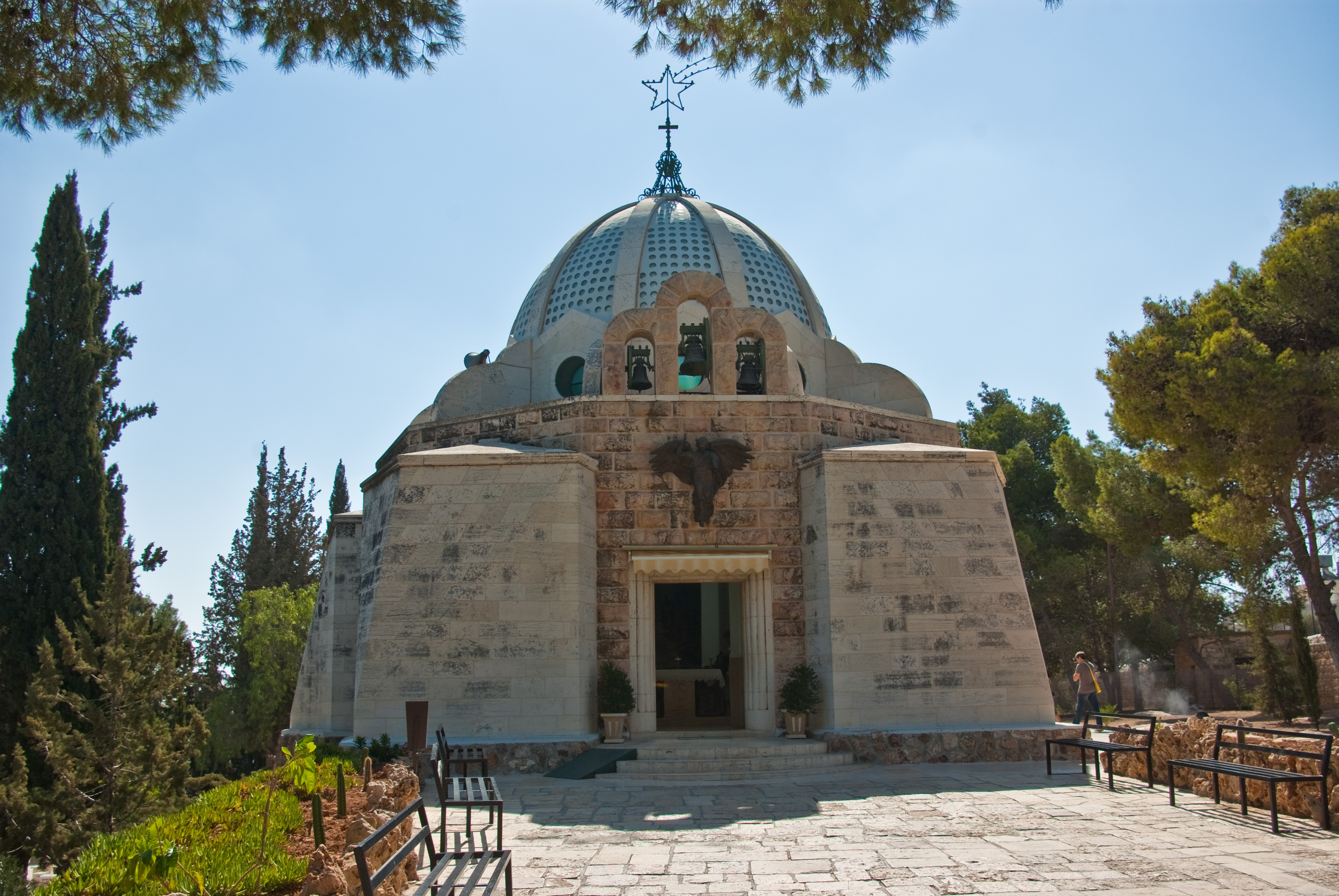
- The chapel in 2010

- Location within the West Bank
- 31°42′26.3″N 35°13′48.4″E
- Location: Bethlehem
- Country: State of Palestine
- Denomination: Roman Catholic Church

Architecture
- Architect: Antonio Barluzzi
- Completed: 1953

The Shepherds' Field Chapel (Arabic: كنيسة حقل الرعاة; Hebrew: כנסיית שדה הרועים), or the Sanctuary of Gloria in excelsis Deo, is a Roman Catholic religious building in Beit Sahour, southeast of Bethlehem, West Bank, Palestine. The chapel commemorates the annunciation of Jesus' birth to the shepherds, said to have taken place in Beit Sahour. It is distinct from the traditional pilgrimage site and ancient church dedicated to the same event and located not far from it, within the Greek Orthodox Monastery of the Shepherds (Arabic: Deir el-Rawat).

== Biblical relevance ==
The Palestinian village of Beit Sahour, next to Bethlehem, has been identified by Latin Church tradition as the site of the Annunciation to the shepherds – that is, the place where the announcement of Jesus’ birth to shepherds by angels took place. The area close to the church is also identified as the "Valley of Boaz", mentioned in the Old Testament, in Ruth 2:2, as the place where Ruth gleaned grain for herself and Naomi.

In 1858, the remains of a monastery built around 400 A.D. were discovered, on what was called the "Khirbet Siyar al-Ghanem" – the "Ruins of the Sheep Enclosure" or "Ruins of the Sheepfold"). The French official responsible for the excavations claimed to have found the three “shepherds’ tombs” mentioned by a pilgrim who visited Beit Sahour around the year 680. Between 1889 and 1906, the Franciscans succeeded in buying the land.

== History ==
=== Roman period ===
Franciscan archaeologist Virgilio Canio Corbo excavated the site and found caves with evidence of human habitation during the Herodian and later Roman period, as well as ancient oil presses. Corbo used his findings as arguments in favour of the hypothesis that a small community inhabited the site at the time of Jesus' birth. Murphy-O'Connor concludes that the site was occupied during the first century by nomadic shepherds.

=== Byzantine period ===
Over the Roman-period remnants, a Byzantine monastery was built at the end of the 4th century, which went through a second, rebuilding and expansion phase in the 6th. The monastery was destroyed by the Persians in 614 and was not reoccupied afterwards. The remains were destroyed in the 8th century by Muslims who chiseled off the Christian signs from several stones.

=== Modern church ===
The Shepherds' Field Chapel was built by the Franciscans in 1953. The Catholic chapel is dedicated to Our Lady of Fátima.

== Architecture ==
The chapel was designed by architect Antonio Barluzzi. A grotto rises up behind the chapel.

It has five apses that mimic the structure of a nomadic tent in gray. The words of the angel to the shepherds are inscribed gold. An image depicting the birth of Jesus and the adoration of the shepherds can be seen in the place.

== Gallery ==
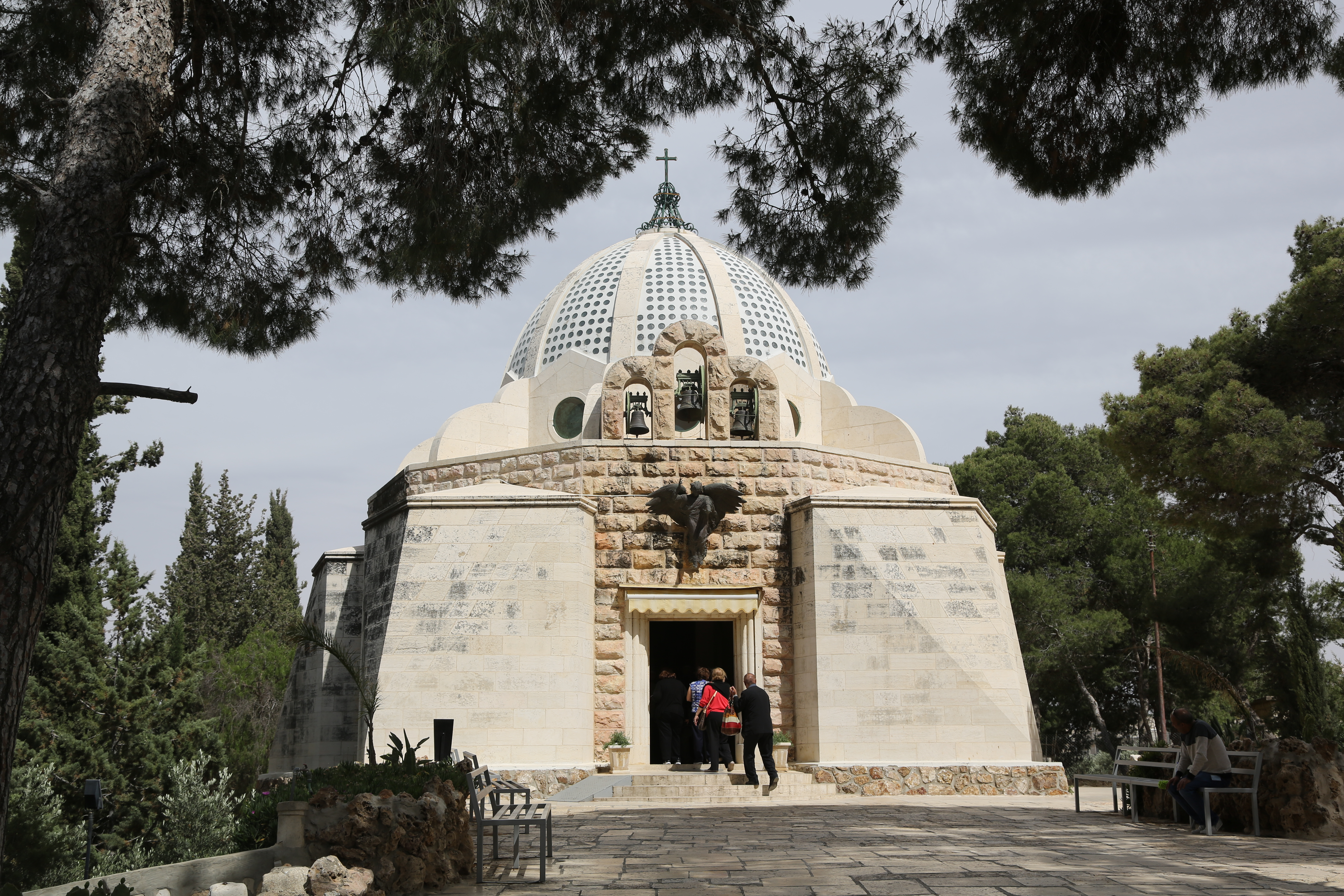
The chapel

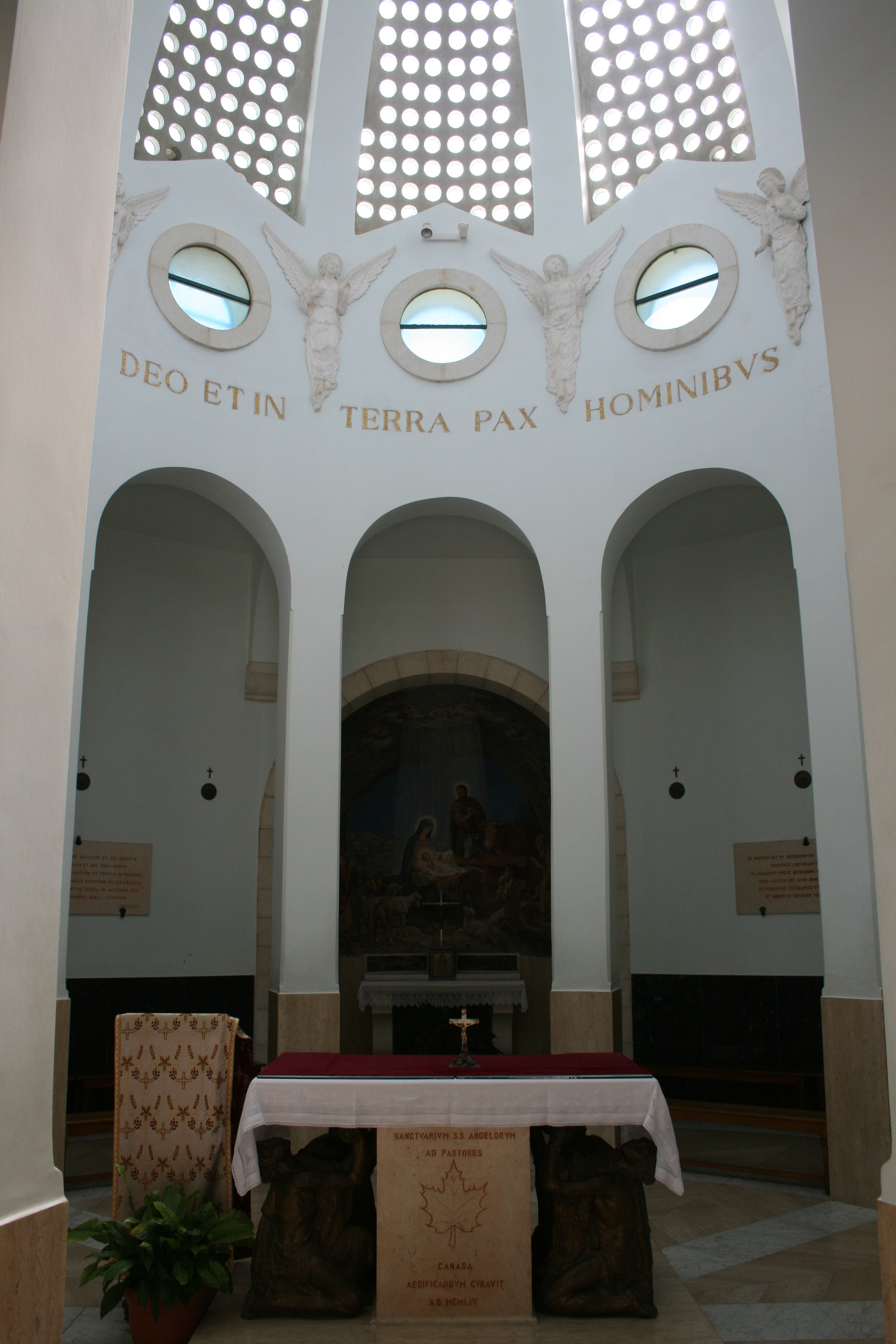
Interior

Nativity painting

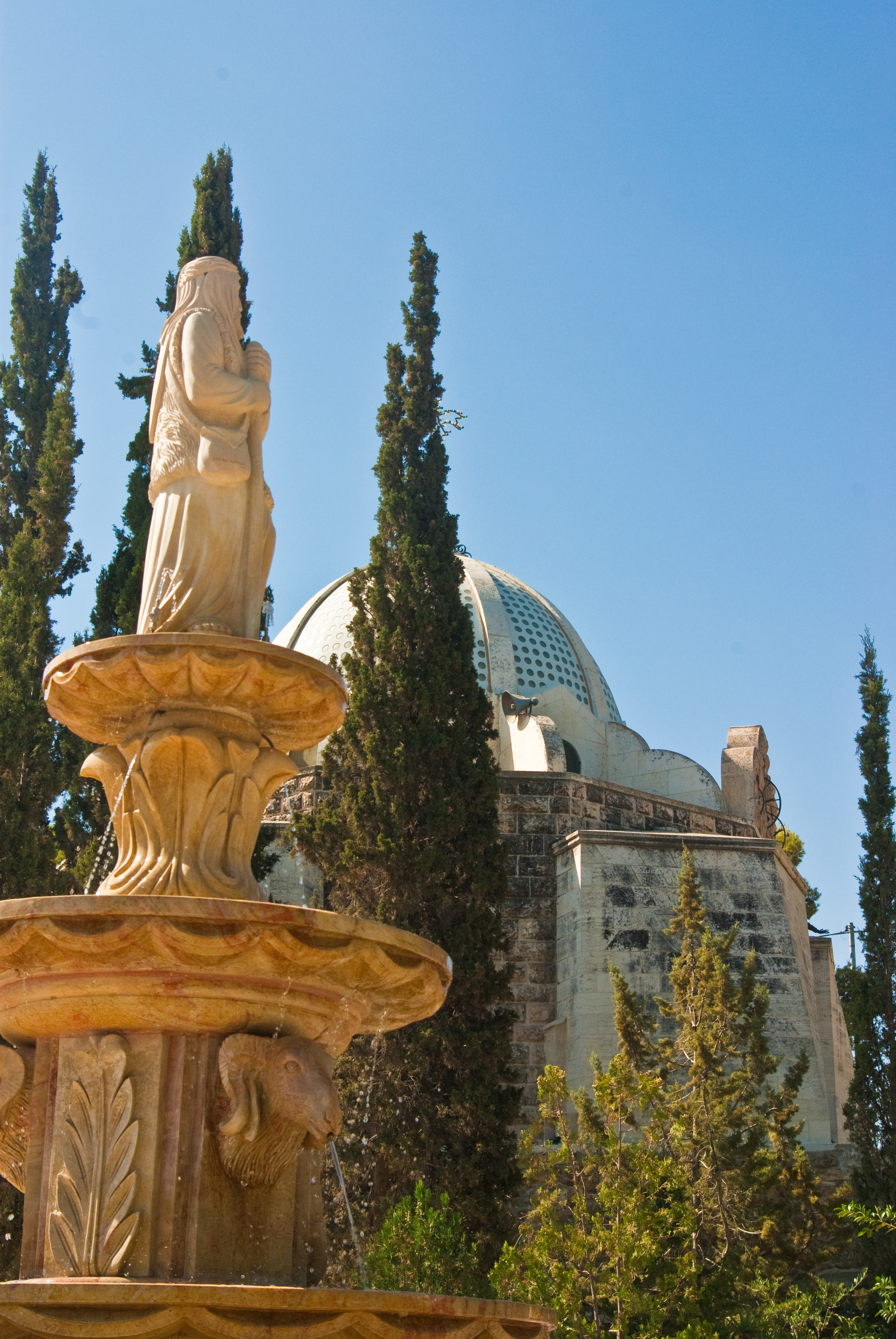
Fountain in the courtyard

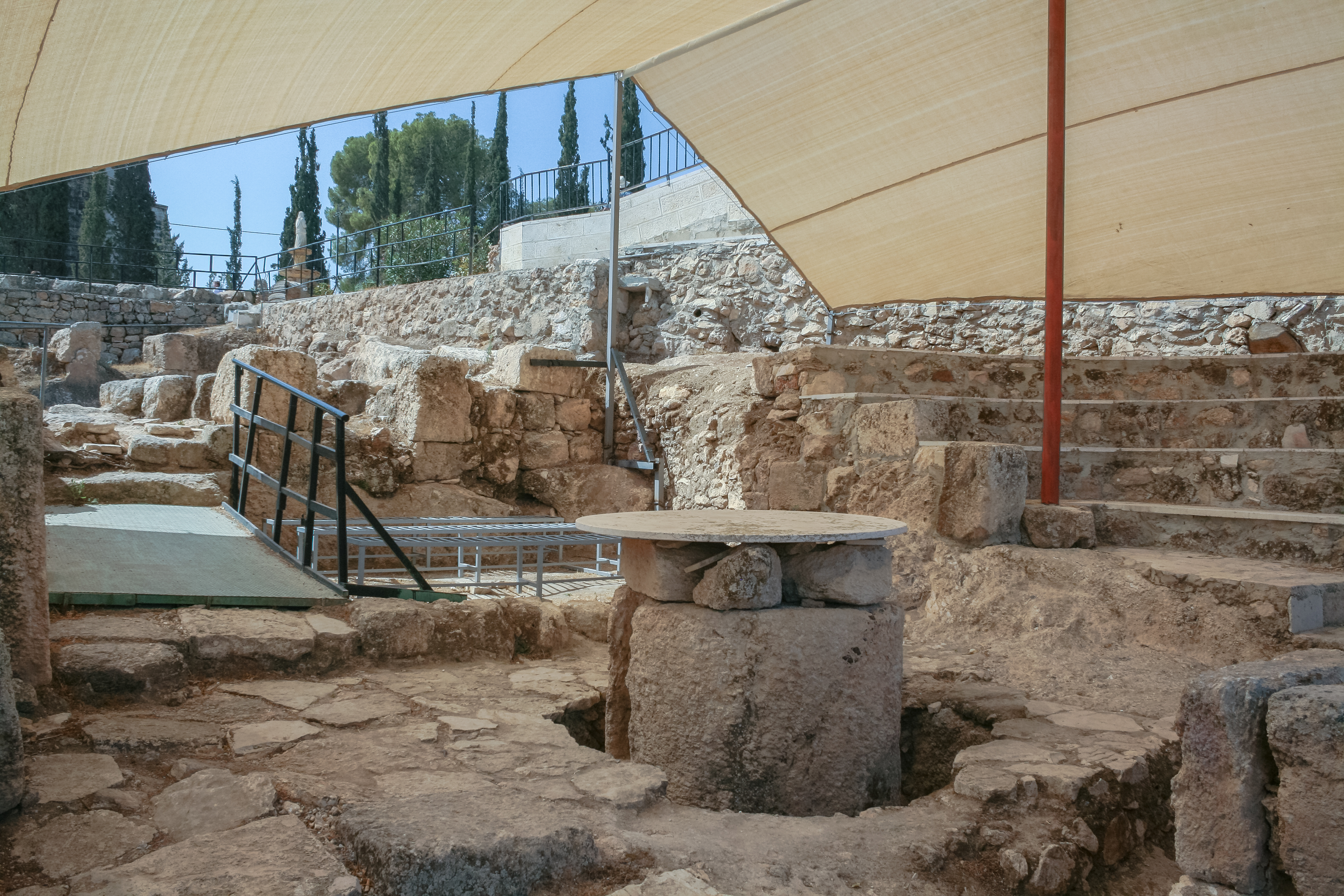
Excavations

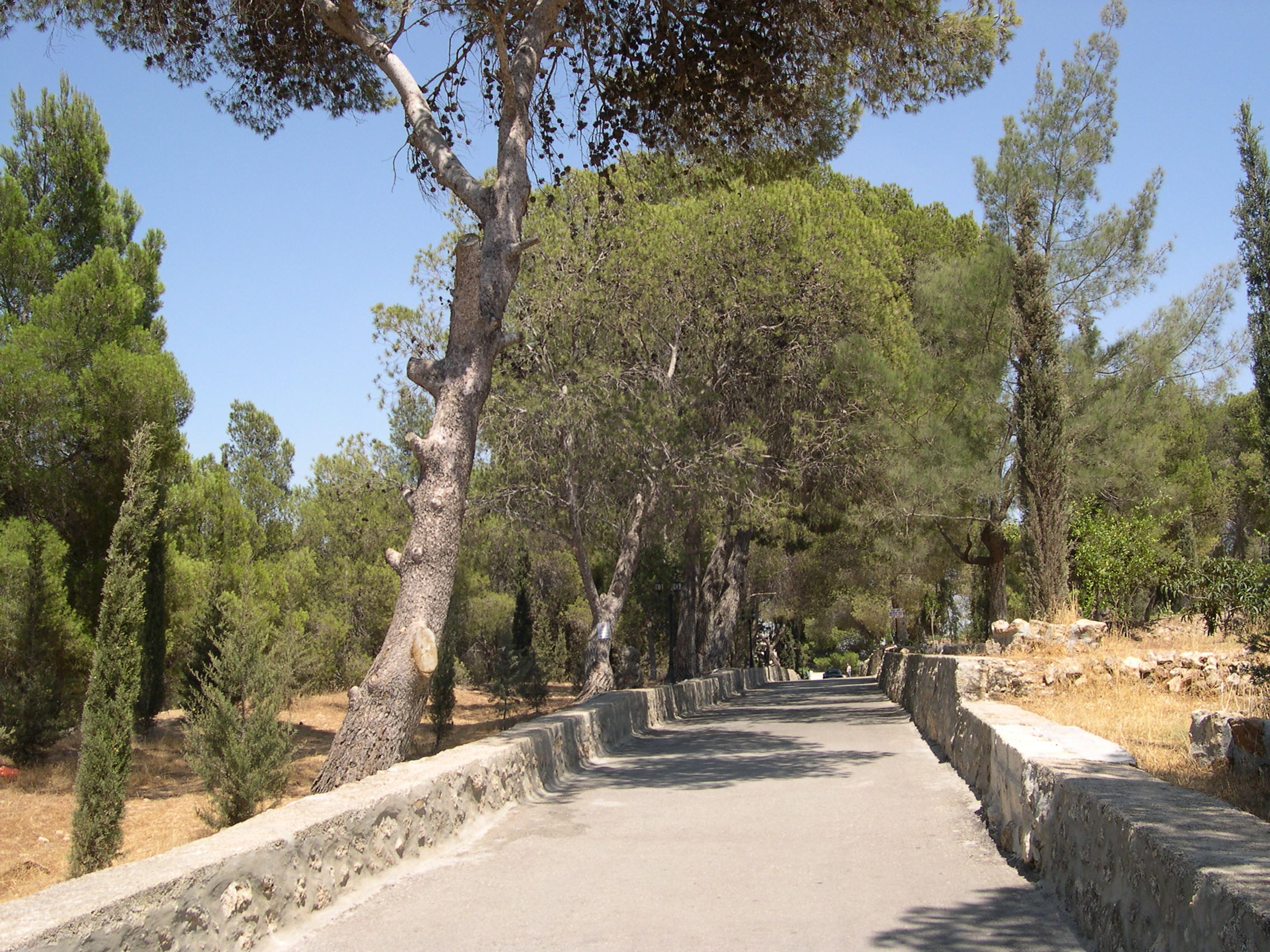
Access alley

== See also ==
- Roman Catholicism in the State of Palestine
- Church of St. Catherine, Bethlehem
