= Italian Hospital in Haifa =

Coordinates: 32.8228°N 34.9886°E

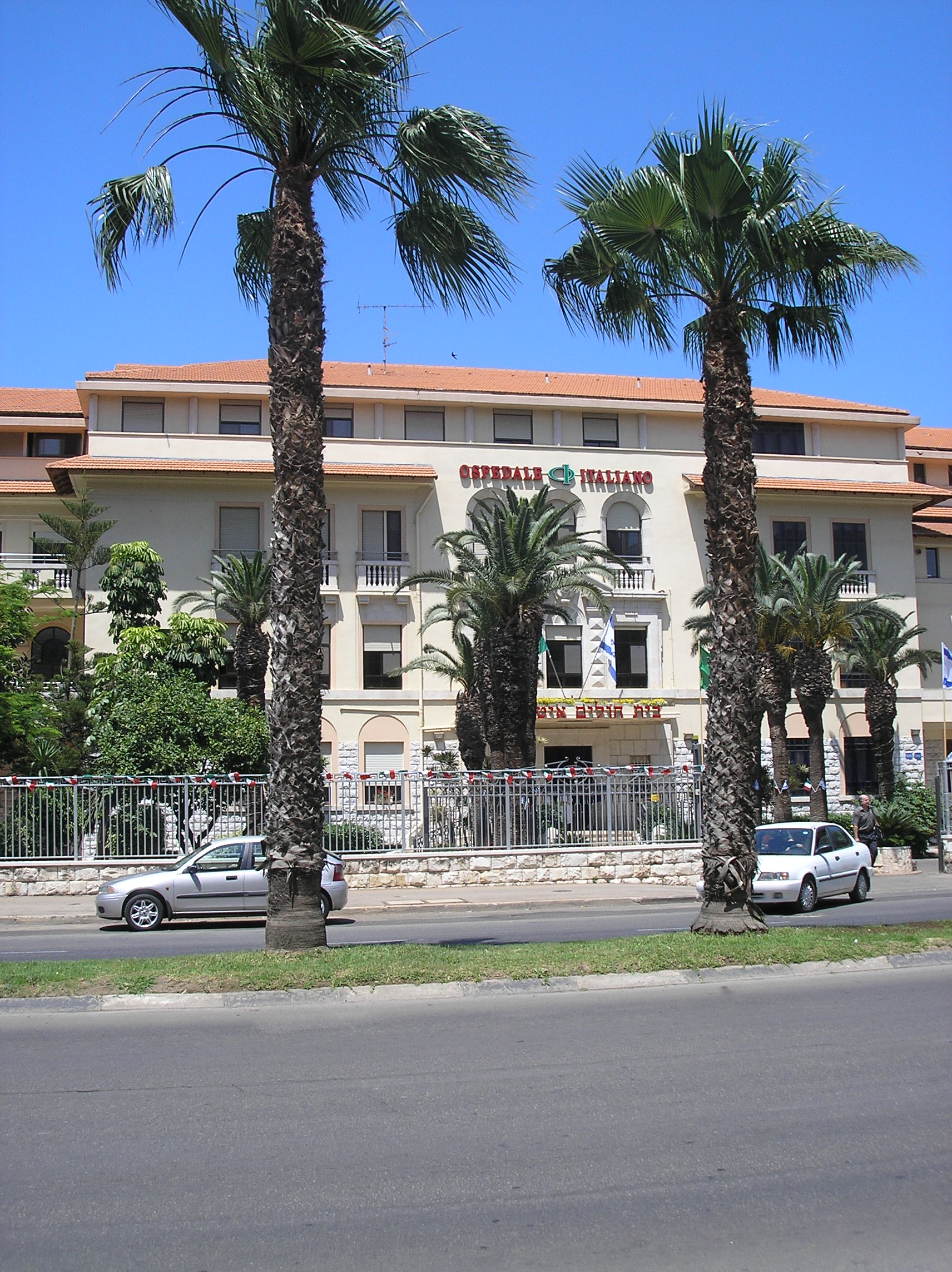
- The Italian Hospital in Haifa

Geography
- Location: 106 Sderot HaMeginim, Bat Galim, Haifa, Israel

Organisation
- Funding: Private / Charitable / Religious
- Type: General and oncology hospital
- Patron: Franciscan Missionary Sisters of the Immaculate Heart of Mary

Services
- Beds: 100

History
- Opened: 1907

The Italian Hospital in Haifa (Italian: Ospedale Italiano, Hebrew: בית החולים האיטלקי בחיפה) is a medical center administered by the National Association for Assistance to Italian Missionaries (ANSMI). Inaugurated at the current location in 1932-33, the hospital is run by the Franciscan Missionary Sisters of the Immaculate Heart of Mary, who are providing the nursing staff which is also residing in the hospital. The hospital contains over 100 beds.

== Capacity and departments ==
The hospital is run by Franciscan nuns. In 2007 the hospital had over a hundred beds, tended by 85 employed staff, ten of which were nuns.

The Italian Hospital has four departments: oncology, general medicine, surgery and orthopedic rehabilitation. The oncology department is acting as a subsidiary of the Rambam Hospital and underwent a major technological upgrade in 2016, when a complete oncological radiation treatment center was installed, consisting in a CT simulator, a cobalt radiation therapy room and sophisticated software for accurate results. The center replaced the old analog system with a new modern digital system.

== Building ==
The four-story building was designed by the Italian architect Antonio Barluzzi.

== History ==
The hospital was founded in 1907 as the Italian Surgical Hospital, the name reflecting its main activity. It was the only medical center in northern Palestine and employed Italian, Jewish and Arab surgeons.

The staff moved into the current building in 1932 or 1933. From the beginning, the hospital was administered by the Franciscan Missionary Sisters of Egypt, as they were called at the time.

The Italian Hospital ceased to function as such during the First and Second World Wars, as Italy was an enemy of the empires ruling Palestine during both conflicts, and again after the State of Israel was established in 1948, when the Israeli Army (IDF) used it as a military hospital. In 1951 Israel returned it to Italian hands.

The oncology department was founded in 1950 and its cobalt therapy device was the first in northern Israel. Ten years later, for professional reasons, the department subordinated its activity to Haifa's main teaching hospital, Rambam.
