= Church of All Nations =

Church constructed 1919–1924 in Jerusalem

Coordinates: 31.779227°N 35.239628°E

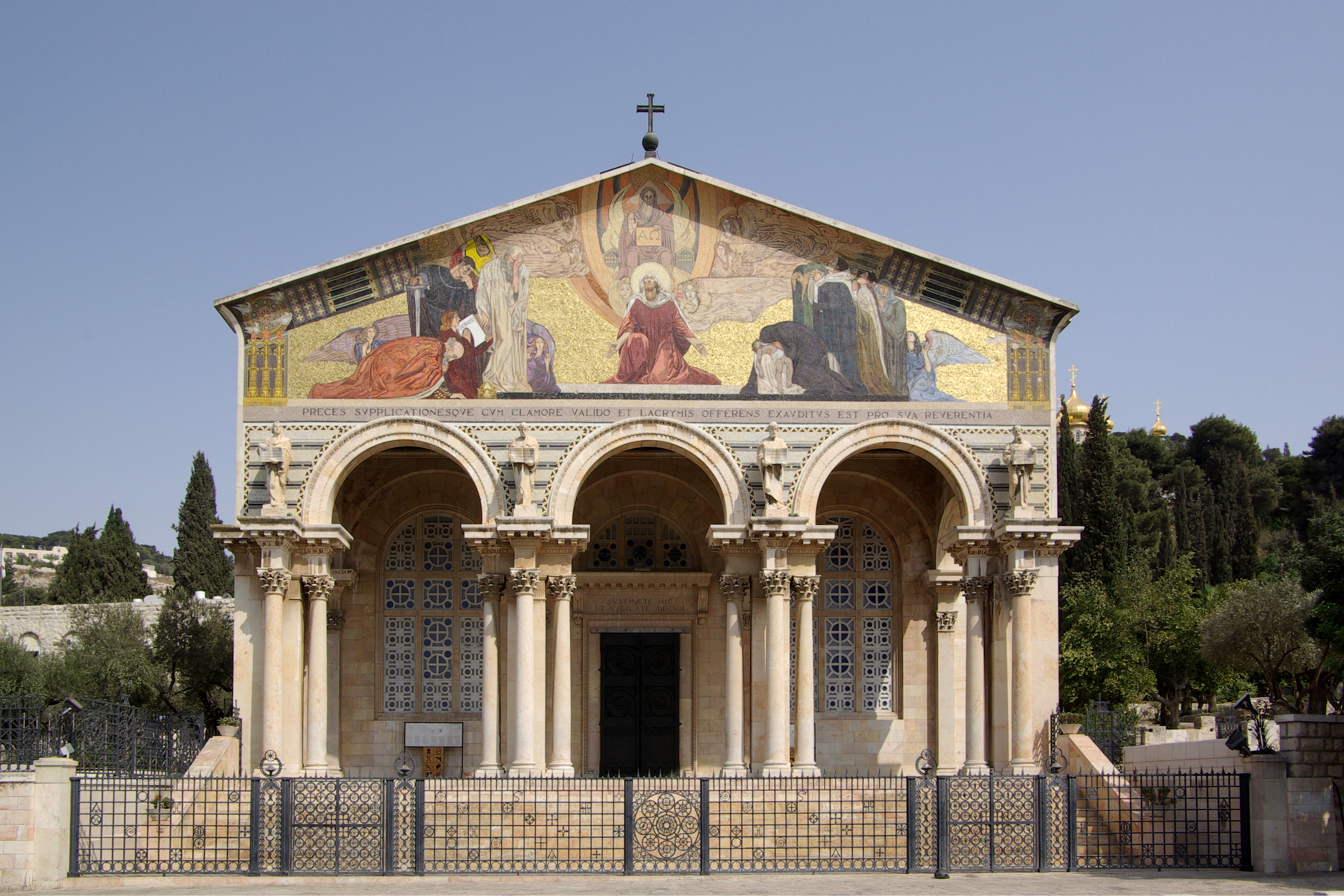
- Church façade
- Church of All Nations
- Location: Mount of Olives, Jerusalem
- Denomination: Catholic

History
- Status: Minor Basilica
- Consecrated: June 1924

Architecture
- Architect: Antonio Barluzzi
- Style: Neo-Byzantine
- Completed: 1924

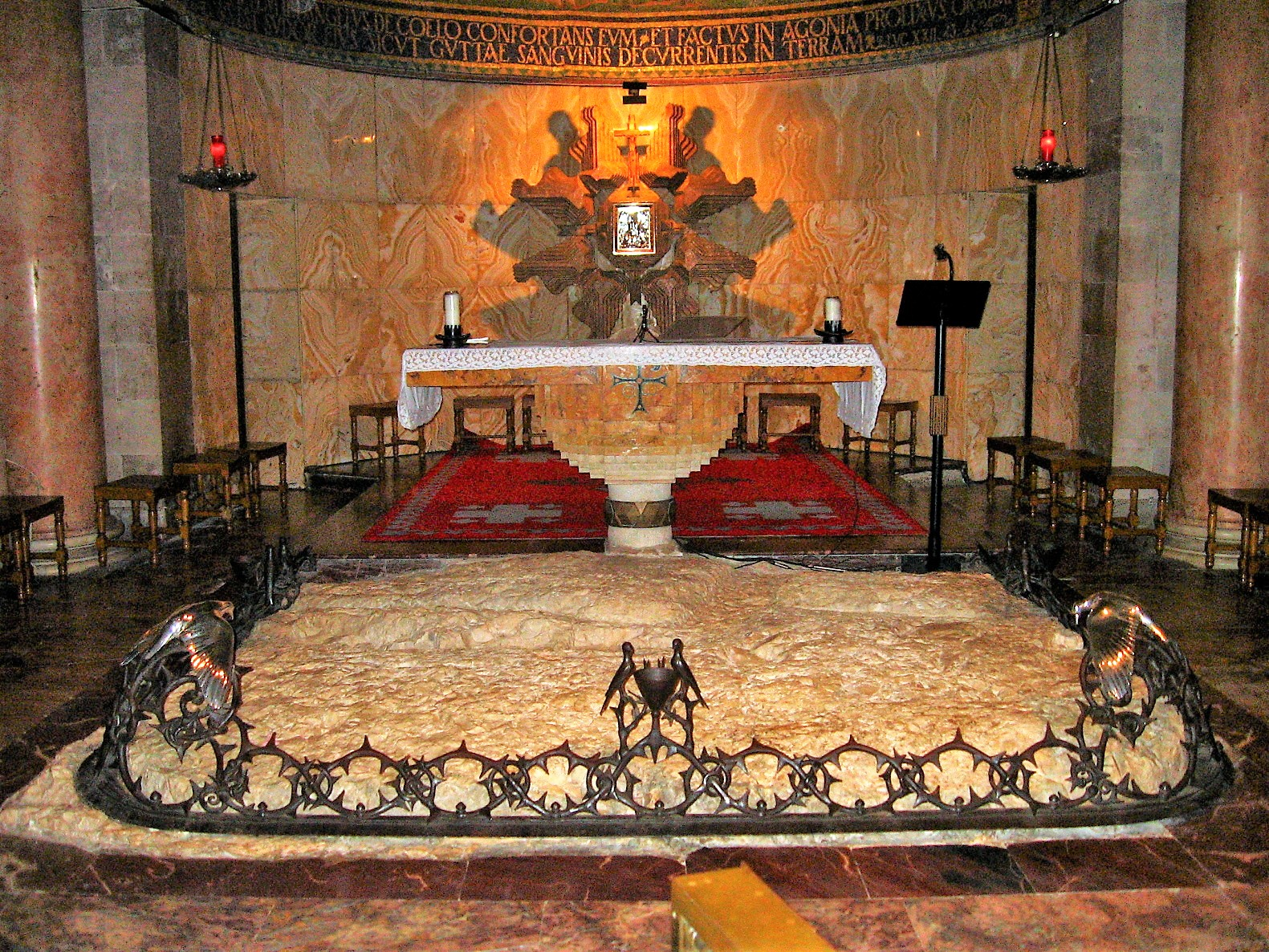
The bedrock where Jesus is believed to have prayed

The Church of All Nations (Hebrew: כנסיית כל העמים; Arabic: كنيسة كل الأمم), also known as the Church of Gethsemane or the Basilica of the Agony (Latin: Basilica Agoniæ Domini), is a Catholic church located on the Mount of Olives in East Jerusalem, next to the Garden of Gethsemane. It enshrines a section of bedrock where Jesus is said to have prayed before his arrest. (Mark 14:32–42)

The reasons for its construction in the 1920s were complex, with some political factors.

== History ==
The current church rests on the foundations of two earlier ones, that of a 4th-century Byzantine basilica, destroyed by an earthquake in 746, and of a small 12th-century Crusader chapel abandoned in 1345. In 1920, during work on the foundations, a column was found two meters (6.6 ft) beneath the floor of the medieval crusader chapel. Fragments of a magnificent mosaic were also found. Following this discovery, the architect immediately removed the new foundations and began excavations of the earlier church. After the remains of the Byzantine-era church were fully excavated, plans for the new church were altered and work continued on the current basilica from April 19, 1922, until June 1924 when it was consecrated.

An arson attack took place on the church in December 2020, without much damage having been caused. The Custody of the Holy Land, the official custodian of Catholic holy sites in Israel and Palestine, condemned the arson attack on the church, which is a Christian holy site.

In December 2020, archaeologists revealed the remains of the foundations of a Second Temple-era ritual bath (also known as a mikveh) during construction work on a modern tunnel under the Church of All Nations and a 1,500-year-old Byzantine church. According to Dr. Leah and Dr. Rosario, Greek inscriptions were written on the church's floor as : "for the memory and repose of those who love Christ… accept the offering of your servants and give them remission of sins”. According to Israel Antiquities Authority's Jerusalem district head Amit Re’em, the bath is notable, based on the archaeological evidence, as a later Christian pilgrimage site that was in fact used in the days of Jesus.

== Use by other denominations ==
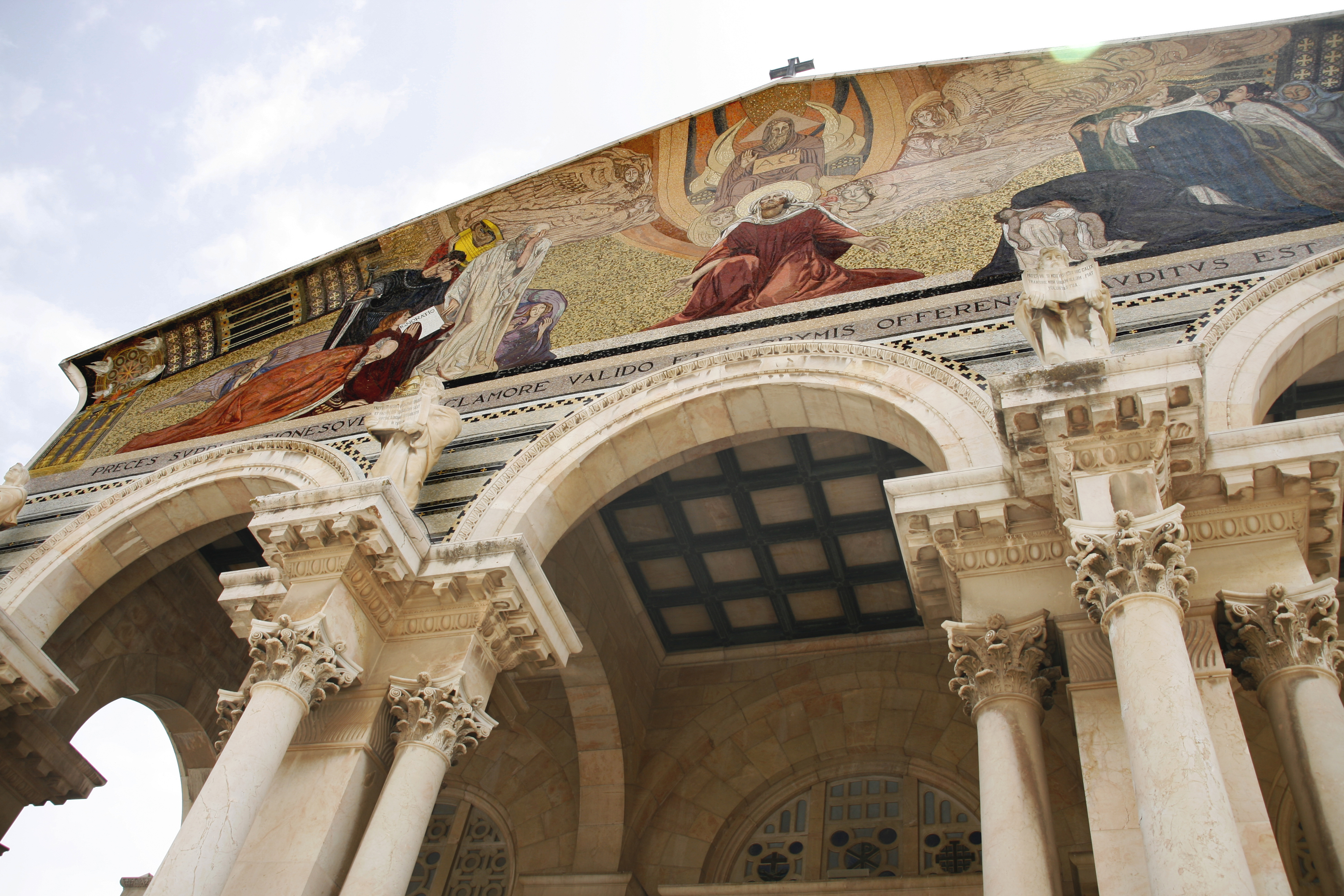
Facade of the church with the evangelist statues

An open altar located in the gardens of the church is used by many Christian denominations including followers who are Roman Catholic, Eastern Orthodox, Armenian Apostolic, Protestant, Lutheran, Evangelical, Anglican, and any other version of Christianity that is culturally unique to any particular nation.

== Design and construction ==
The church was built between 1919 and 1924 using funds donated from many different countries. The coat-of-arms of twelve of the countries from which donations originated are incorporated into the ceiling, each in a separate, small dome, and also into the interior mosaics. The countries honored in this way are, east to west (altar to entrance) and beginning with the northern apse: Argentina, Brazil, Chile and Mexico; in the middle of the church are commemorated: Italy, France, Spain and the United Kingdom, and to the right: Belgium, Canada, Germany, and the United States of America. The mosaics in the apses were donated by Ireland, Hungary, and Poland (by the sculpturist Tadeusz Adam Zieliński). The crown around the bedrock itself was a gift of Australia. These multi-national donations give the church one of its present names as the "Church of All Nations".

Two types of stone were used in the construction of the church: the interior utilizes a stone from the quarries at Lifta, north-west of Jerusalem; and the exterior, a rose colored stone from Bethlehem. The building is divided by six columns into three aisles, but with an even ceiling lacking a clerestory. This design gives the impression of one large open hall. Alabaster panels dyed violet were used for the windows to evoke a mood of depression analogous to Christ's agony, and the ceiling is painted a deep blue to simulate a night sky.

The facade of the church is supported by a row of Corinthian columns. Atop each column sits statues of the Four Evangelists. First is Mark. Second, Luke holds a quote from Luke 22:43–44 “…factus in agonia prolixius orabat et factus est sudor eius sicut guttae sanguinis decurrentis in terram" or translated from the Vulgate, "And being in agony he prayed more earnestly; and his sweat became like great drops of blood falling down to the ground." Followed by Matthew holding Matthew 26:42b "Pater mi, si non potest hic calix transire nisi bibam illum, fiat voluntas tua" or translated “My Father, if this cup cannot pass unless I drink it, your will be done.” The final statue is of John. The columns and statues are set below a modern mosaic depicting Jesus Christ as mediator between God and man. The designer of the facade mosaic was Professor Giulio Bargellini.

The bubble-domed roof, thick columns, and facade mosaic, give the church a Neoclassical look.

The church was designed by Italian architect Antonio Barluzzi and is currently held in trust by the Franciscan Custody of the Holy Land.

== Picture gallery ==
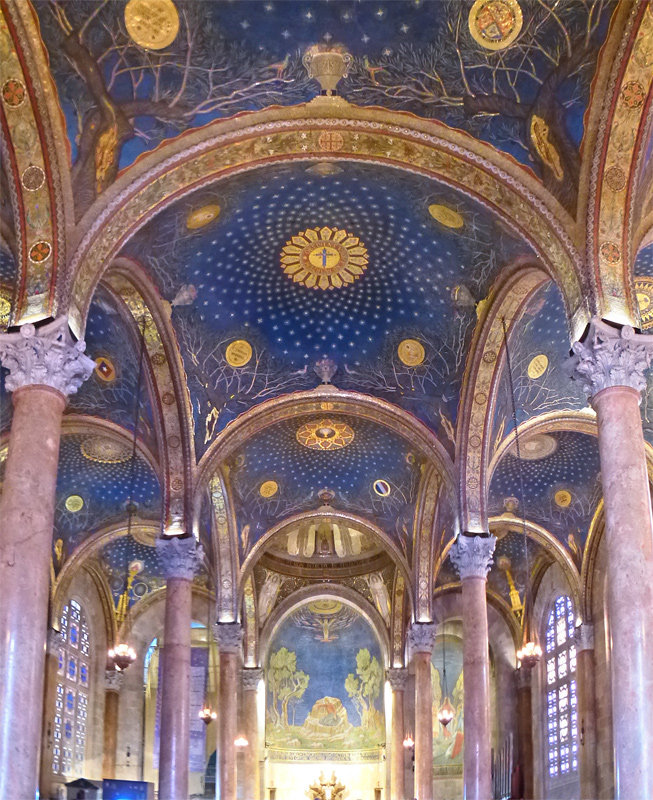
Nave and vault, looking east

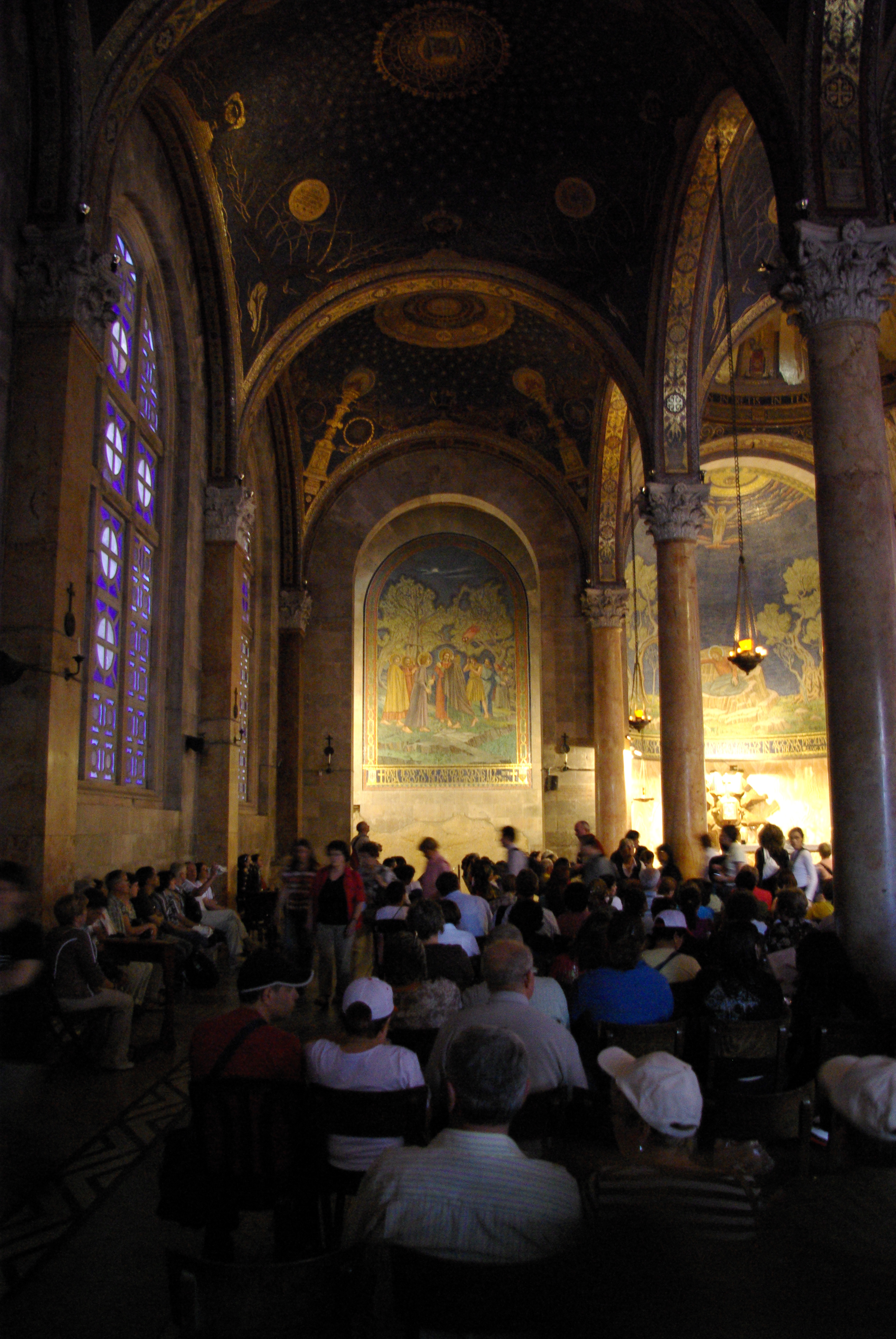
Left aisle

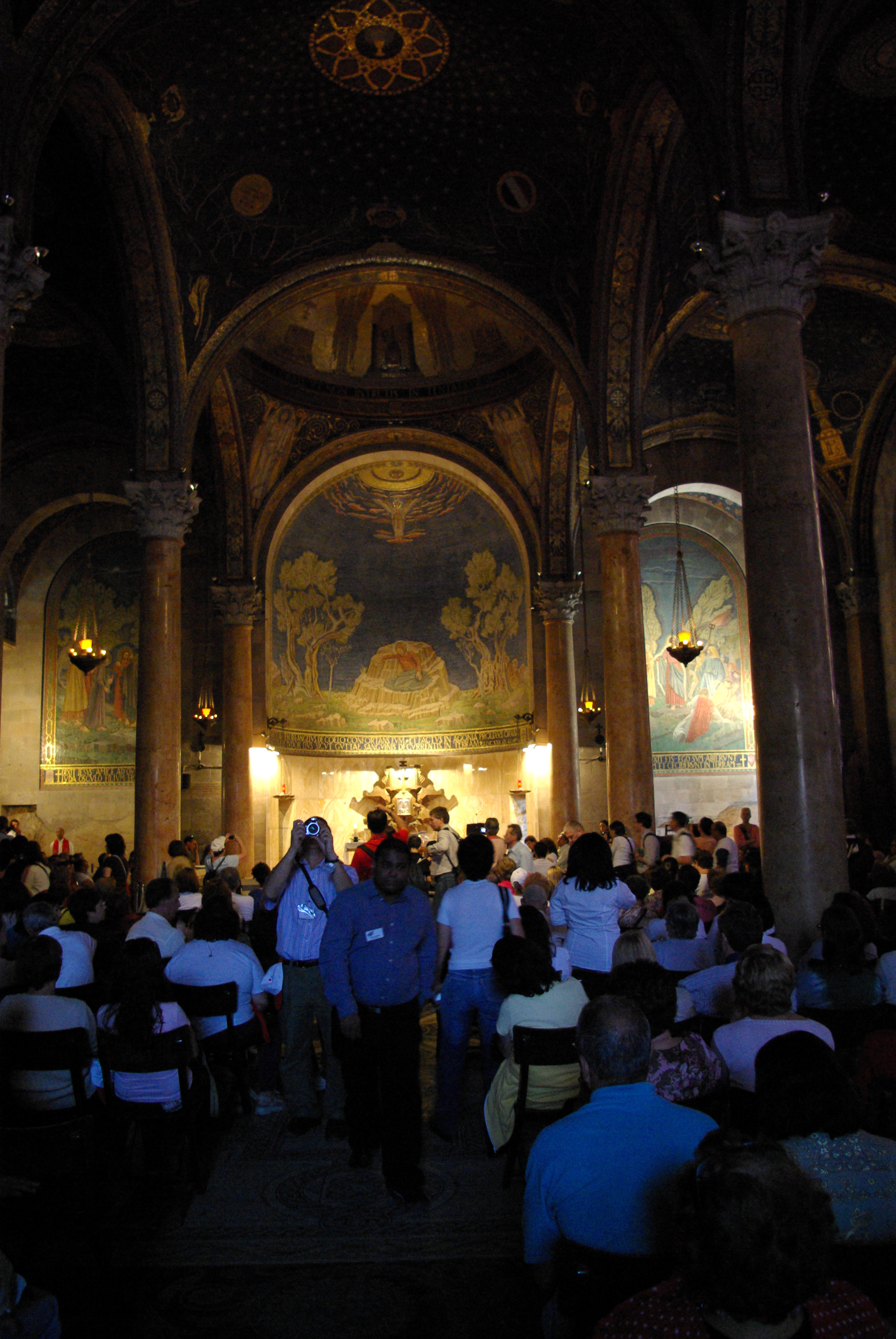
Central aisle

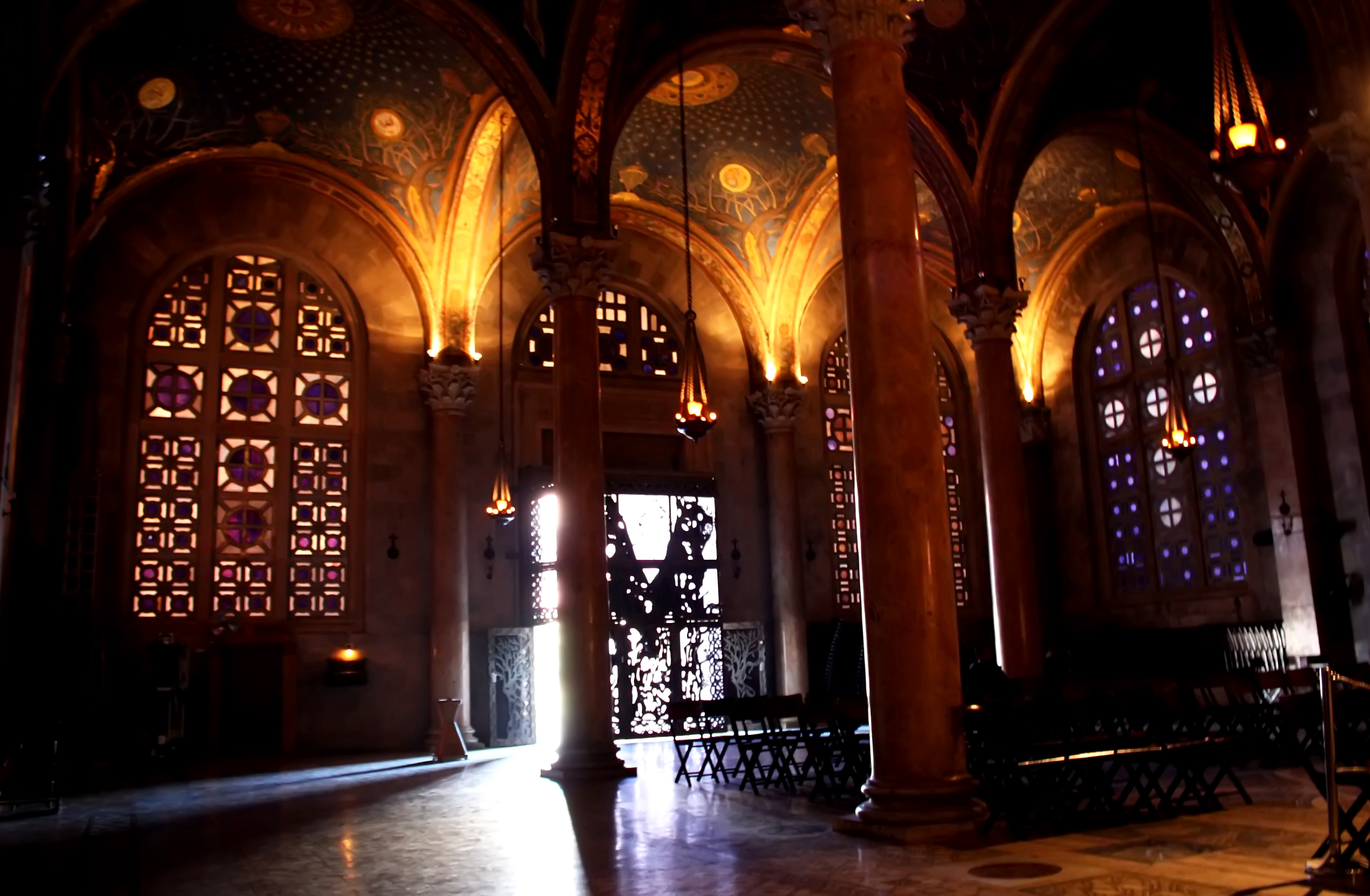
Interior view towards main door

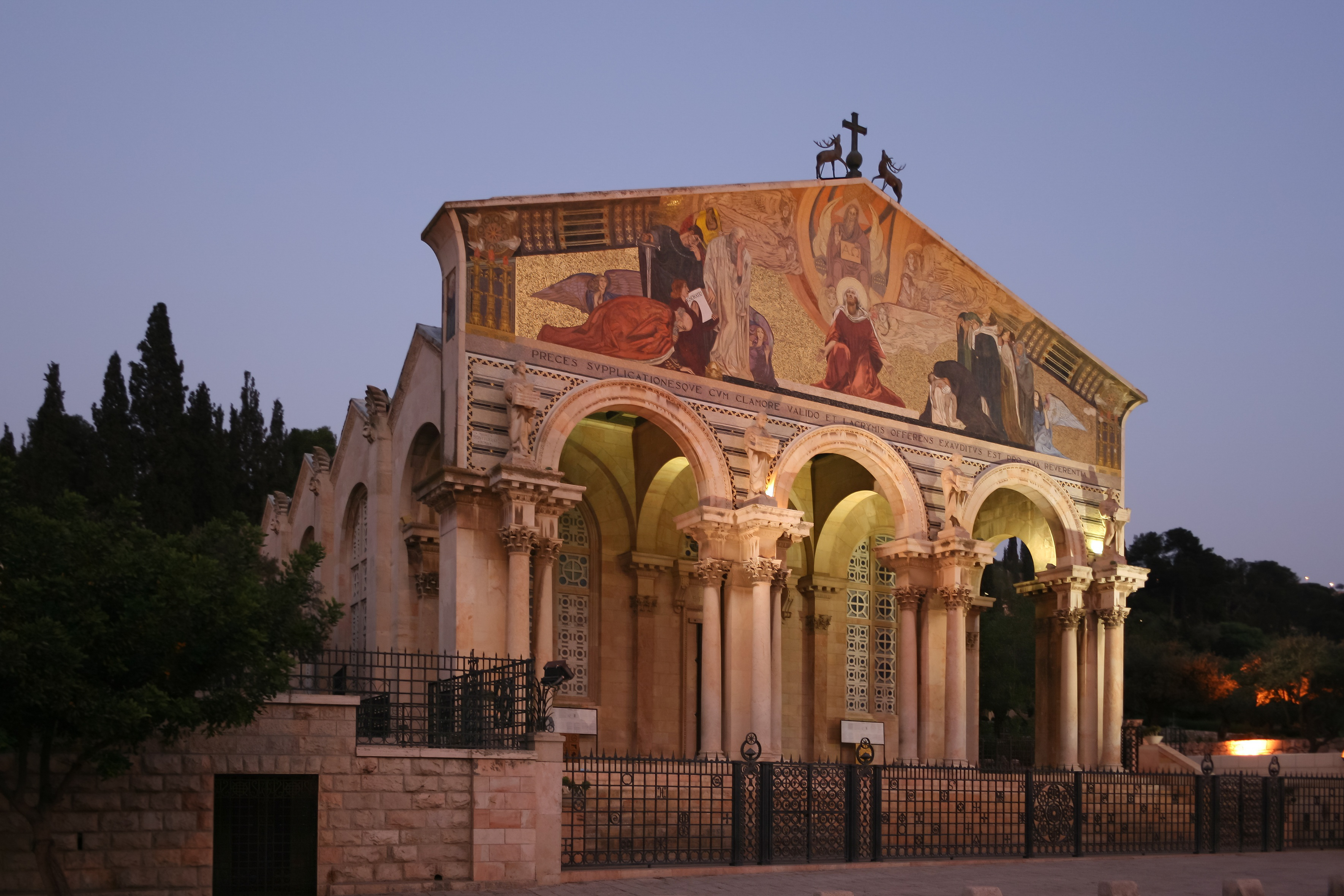
Night view

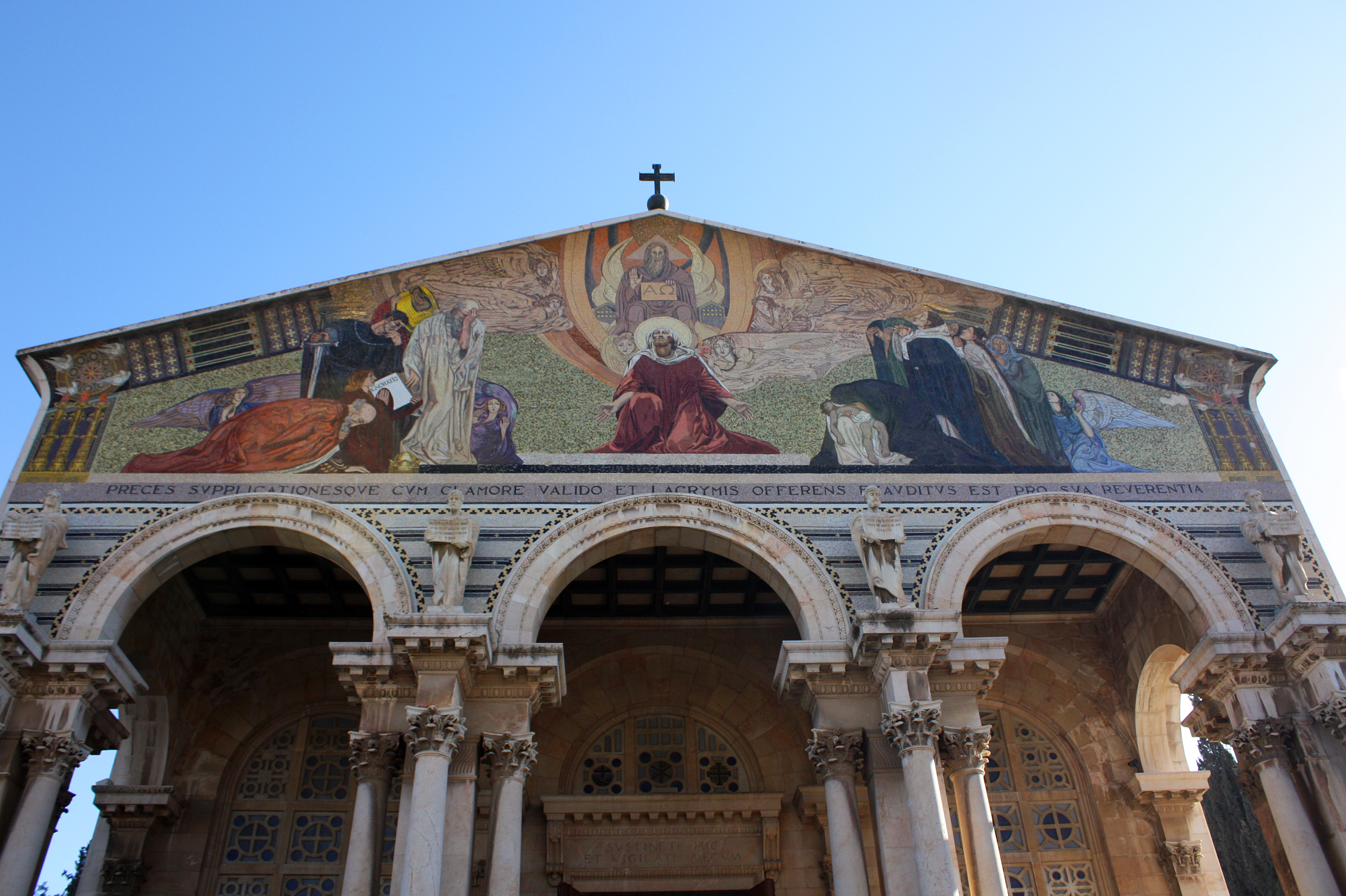
Facade

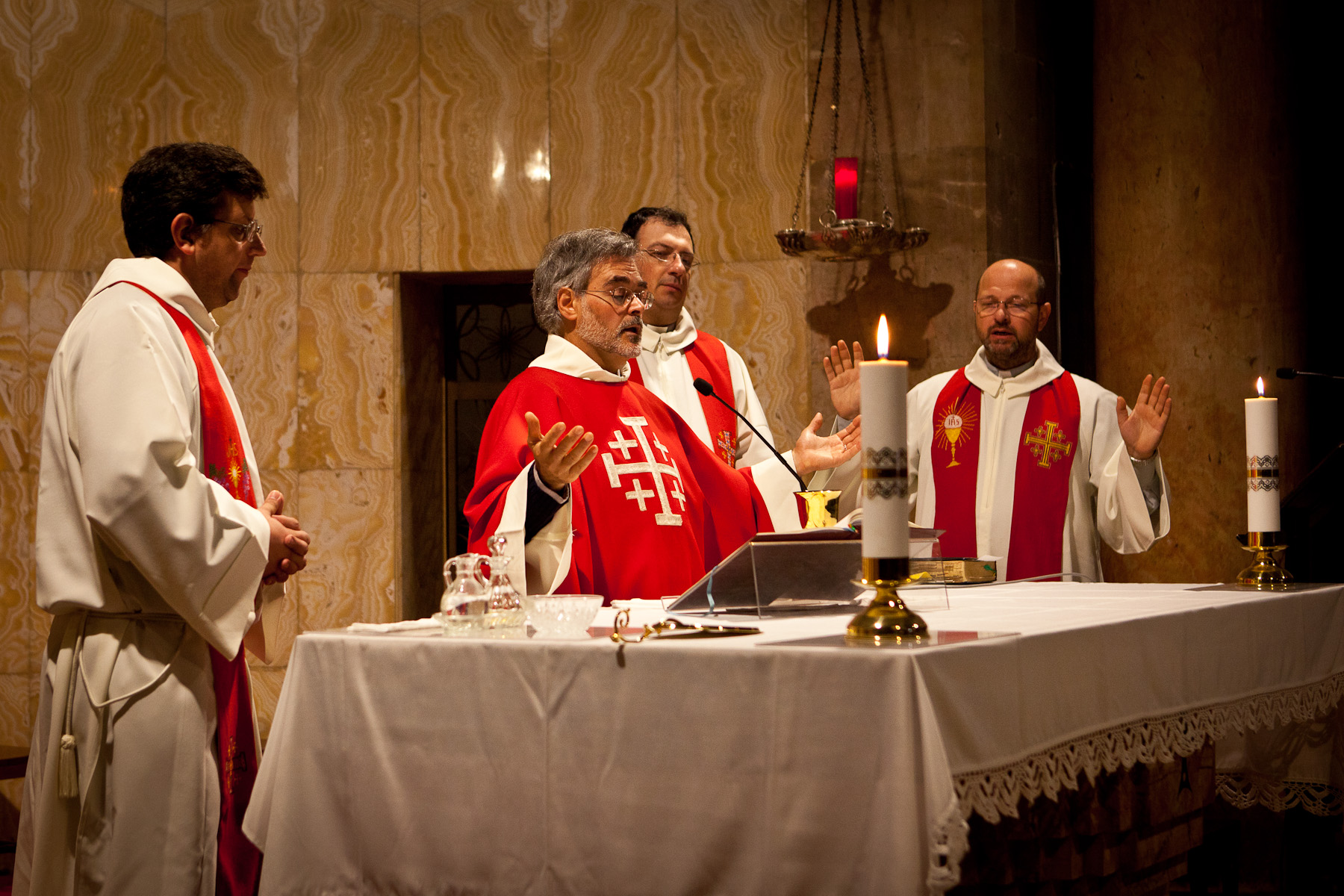
Clergy in 2011
