= Antonio Barluzzi =

Italian architect (1884–1960)

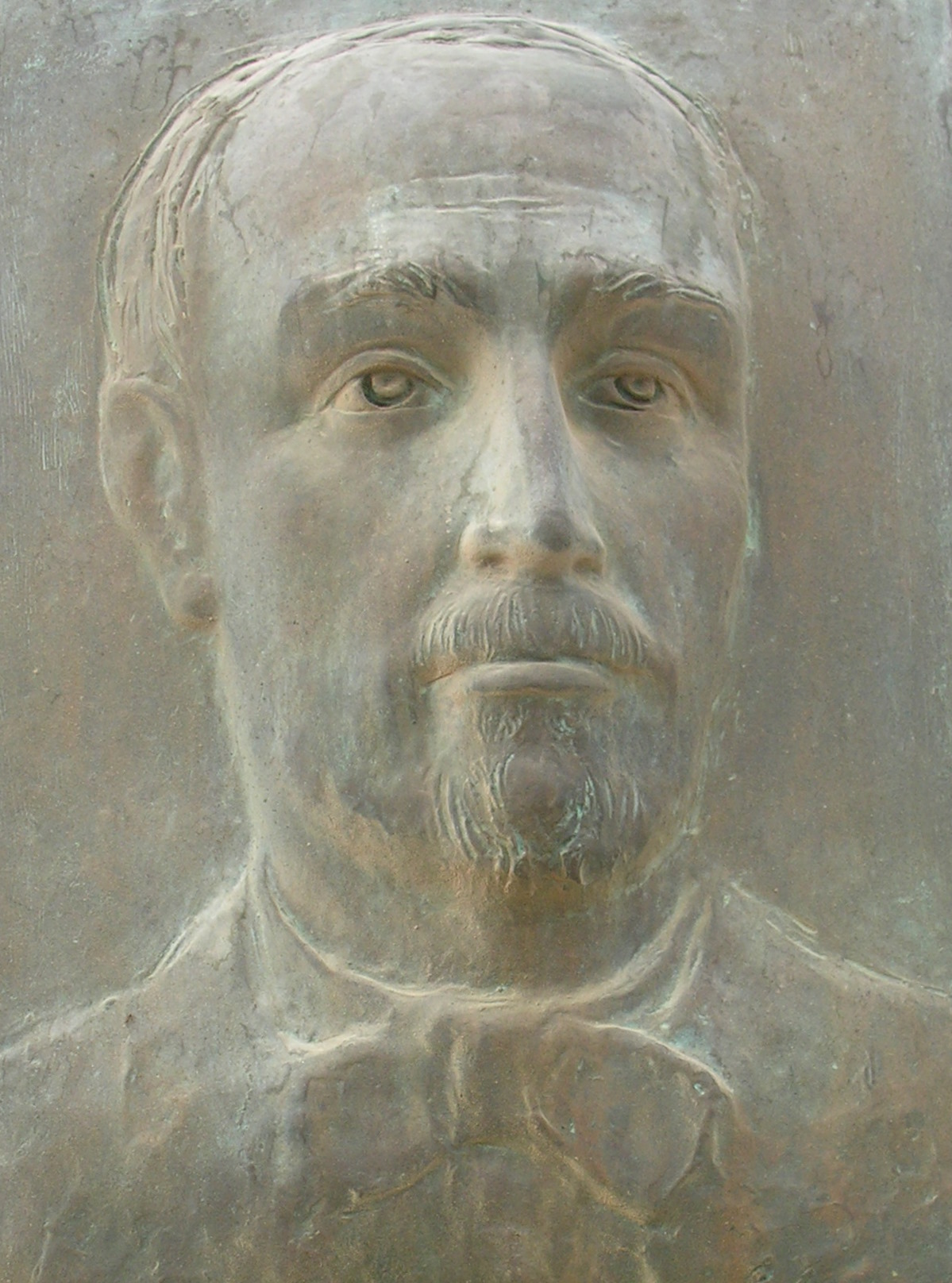
- Antonio Barluzzi memorial plaque on Mount Tabor
- Born: 26 September 1884; Rome, Italy
- Died: 14 December 1960 (aged 76); Rome, Italy
- Education: University of Rome
- Occupation: Architect
- Known for: "The Architect of the Holy Land"
- Political party: National Fascist Party

Antonio Barluzzi (26 September 1884 – 14 December 1960) was an Italian architect who became known as the "Architect of the Holy Land" by creating, among many others, the pilgrimage churches at the Garden of Gethsemane, on Mount Tabor (considered to be the Mount of Transfiguration), on the Mount of Beatitudes (the site of the Sermon on the Mount), and at the tomb of Lazarus in Bethany. He also restored, giving them a new outlook, several churches and chapels including the Catholic chapel on Calvary, within the Church of the Holy Sepulchre. Most of his work was done on commission for the Franciscan Custody of the Holy Land, with whom he was affiliated as a layman rather than as a professed member.

== Biography ==
=== Early life and education ===
Barluzzi was born in Rome, the thirteenth child of Camillo Barluzzi and Maria Anna Busiri-Vici; his maternal grandfather Andrea Busiri-Vici was the architect responsible for the maintenance of St. Peter's Basilica. As early as five years old Barluzzi would create remarkable sketches of churches. His family lived close to the Vatican and historically were workers there. Barluzzi attended the Liceo Umberto I di Roma, where he was instructed by Giulio Salvadori. After leaving school in 1902, he considered entering the seminary, however he was persuaded to delay his entry into the priesthood on the advice of his advisor and confessor Father Corrado, who wanted Barluzzi to further his education first. From 1902 until 1907 he attended the Sapienza University of Rome, successfully attaining a degree in Engineering.

=== First projects ===
Barluzzi spent several years working with his brother, Giulio, on building projects in Italy (1909-1912) and the Middle East (1913-1914). He was unsure whether to enter the priesthood and whilst discerning his vocation worked in Jerusalem on a 100-bed hospital for the Italian Missionary Society. While in Jerusalem he was asked by Father Razzoli, head of the Franciscan Custody of the Holy Land, to submit plans for a basilica on Mount Tabor.

=== World War I ===
With the outbreak of World War I in 1914 he was obliged to return to Italy. There, in 1915, on the recommendation of his confessors he joined the Seminario Romano di S. Giovanni on the Sunday after Easter. However he never attended any lectures and left after only a few weeks. After leaving seminary he joined the Italian army as a Sergeant and began his military service with the Fortifications Office overseeing archaeological excavations at the second-century Castel Sant'Angelo. In 1918 he joined the Palestine detachment and took part in the allied entry into Jerusalem.

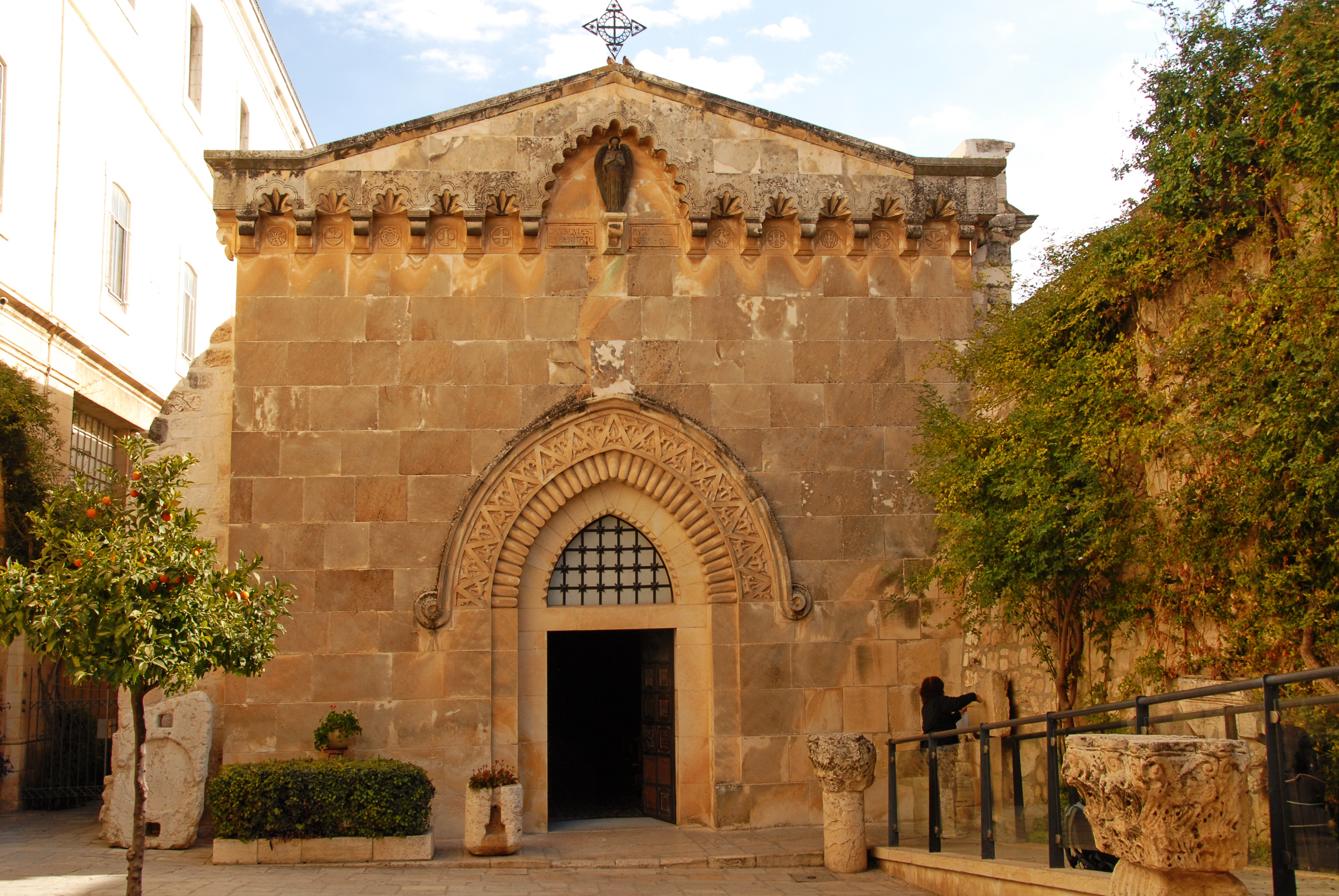
Church of the Flagellation, old city Jerusalem

=== Interbellum ===
While in Palestine he met Father Ferdinando Diotallevi, the new Custos, or head of the Custody of the Holy Land, who had the plans Barluzzi had previously drawn for Mount Tabor during his first visit. He requested Barluzzi start work simultaneously on this and another church at Gethsemane. Worried by this new responsibility Barluzzi returned to Italy to take advice, but ultimately returned to Jerusalem decided and determined. By 1924 he had completed The Church of All Nations at Gethsemane and the Church of the Transfiguration on Mount Tabor. A strong nationalist, Barluzzi was secretary of Jerusalem branch of the Fascist Party from 1927 to 1937.

=== World War II ===
During the Second World War Barluzzi was in Sardinia doing building works for the Franciscan and Capuchin fathers. He remained in Italy until 1947. During this time he planned a great temple at the Holy Sepulchre and what he thought was his final work in the Holy Land, a Shrine to the Incarnation in Nazareth.

=== After the war ===
Barluzzi eventually received the commission for the Nazareth project, and when this decision was revoked in 1958, "he suffered a heart attack which brought on cerebral deafness and pulmonary emphysema".

=== Death ===
Barluzzi died on 14 December 1960 in a small room at the Delegation of the Holy Land in Rome. His funeral was celebrated at the Basilica di Sant'Antonio at Lateran and was attended by Cardinal Gustavo Testa, the procurator General of the Franciscan Order and former Apostolic Delegate in Palestine.

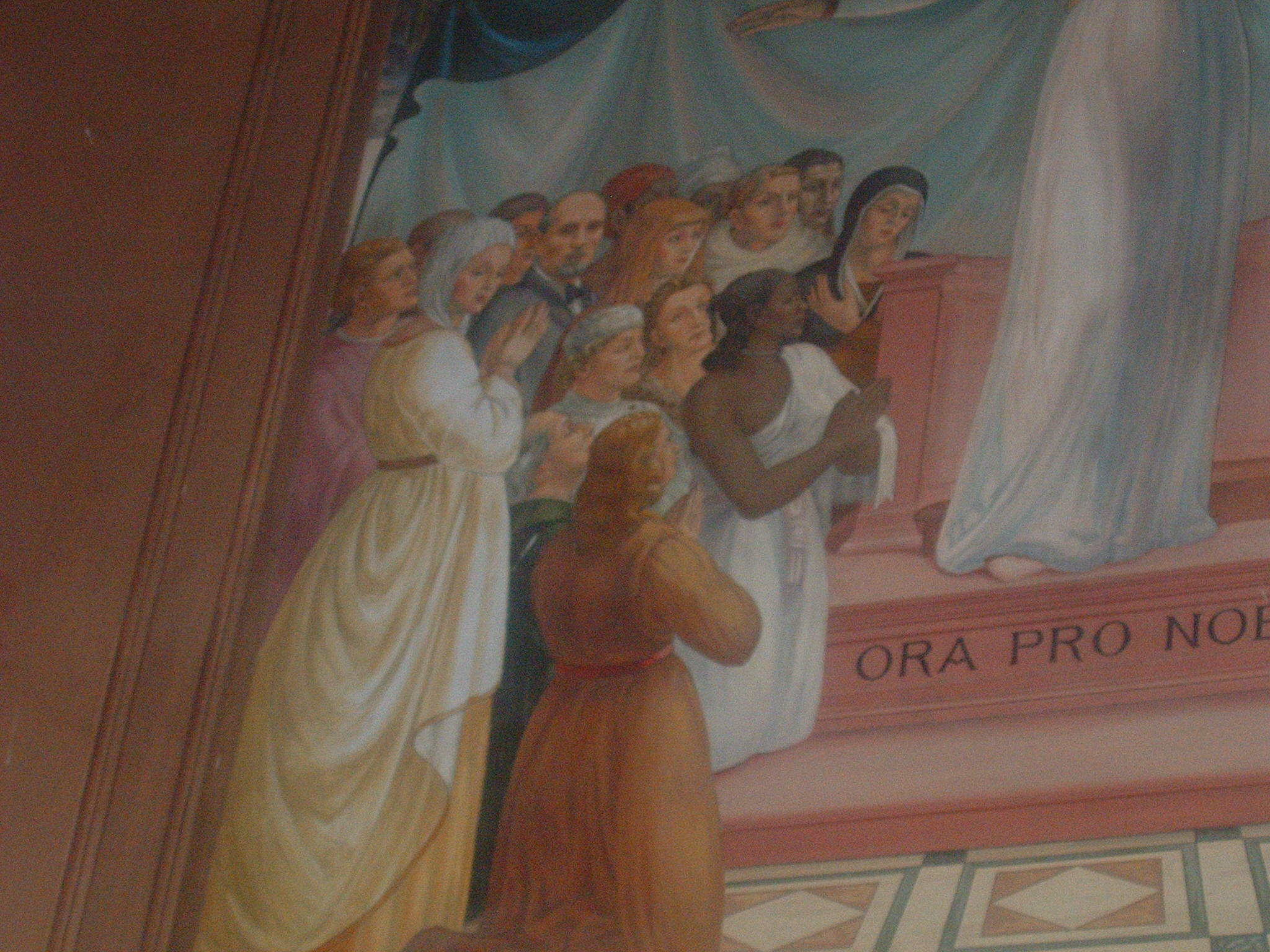
Barluzzi appears in a fresco in his Church of the Visitation at Ein Karem

== Legacy ==
There is a likeness of him near his church on Mount Tabor and he also appears in a fresco on the wall of the church he designed at Ein Karem.

Barluzzi himself never wore his medals or spoke of his awards and behaved like a simple monk whenever possible.

Of his designs, the architecture writer H.V. Morton wrote "They are remarkable for their originality and the variety of their design... Barluzzi will be recognised as a genius in years to come."

== Distinctions ==
=== Orders ===
- Italy: Grand Officer of the Order of Merit of the Italian Republic (24 July 1957)
- Italy: Knight of the Order of the Crown of Italy (1922)
- Holy See: Commander of the Order of the Holy Sepulchre (1923)
- Sovereign Military Order of Malta: Knight Commander of the Sovereign Military Order of Malta

=== Fellowships ===
- Honorary Vice-consul of Italy in Palestine
- Member of the Archaeological Advisory Board of Jerusalem
- Member of the Pontifical Academy of Fine Arts

== See also ==
- Pro-Jerusalem Society (1918-1926) - "le Capitaine Barluzzi" was a member of its leading Council

== Works ==
In chronological order, by construction years:

- Italian Hospital in Jerusalem, together with his brother Giulio, 1912–1919
- Church of All Nations, Gethsemane, 1919–24
- Church of the Transfiguration, Mount Tabor, 1921–24
- Church and Hospice of Jesus the Good Shepherd in Jericho, 1924–25
  - A school for girls in Jericho, 1924
- Restoration of the Italian Legation premises at Teheran, 1925–26
- Terra Sancta College, Jerusalem, built by the Society of Saint Paul of Milan as the "Opera Cardinal Ferrari", 1926
- The Italian Hospital in Amman, Emirate of Transjordan (today's Jordan), 1926–28, the very first hospital in that city
- Church of the Flagellation, Via Dolorosa, Jerusalem, rebuilt over Crusader ruins, 1927–29
- A new house for the Carmelite Fathers of Haifa and restoration of their church on Mount Carmel, 1930
- The Italian Hospital in Karak, Transjordan, 1931–33
- The Italian Hospital in Haifa, inaugurated in 1932 or 33
- Restoration of the Catholic chapel of the Calvary in the Church of the Holy Sepulchre, Jerusalem, 1933–37
- Convent and College of St Anthony (Italian: Collegio Sant'Antonio), Jerusalem, 1936, for the Sisters of the Immaculate Heart of Mary (history here, photos including plaque here)
- Church of the Beatitudes, Mount of Beatitudes by the Sea of Galilee, 1937-38
- Restoration of the Cloister of St. Jerome at the Church of Saint Catherine, Bethlehem, 1947
- The parish churches in Beit Sahour (Church of Our Lady of Fatima), 1951
- Church of St. Lazarus, al-Eizariya (biblical Bethany), 1952–53
- Restoration of the Church of the Holy Face and Saint Veronica (Greek Catholic), Via Dolorosa, Jerusalem, 1953
- Church of the Angels or Gloria in Excelsis, Shepherds' Field, Beit Sahour near Bethlehem, 1953–54
- Church of Dominus Flevit, Mount of Olives, 1954–55
- Restoration of the Church of Bethphage, Mount of Olives (at-Tur), 1954; including a Romanesque-style tower
- Church of the Visitation, Ein Karem, completed 1955
- The Latin Parish Church of St. Joseph, Haifa, run by the Carmelites, built 1959–1961, inaugurated on June 29 June 1961

Date missing

- Armenian Catholic Patriarchate, Beirut
- Churches and other related buildings in Amman and Madaba, Jordan
- The parish churches in Irbid and Zarqa, Jordan
- Restoration of the Ethiopian Monastery, Jerusalem (probably of the Kidane Mehret Church and its monastery)
