= Church of Saint Catherine, Bethlehem =

Church in Bethlehem, West Bank, Palestine

Church of Saint Catherine
- Ecclesia Sanctae Catharinae
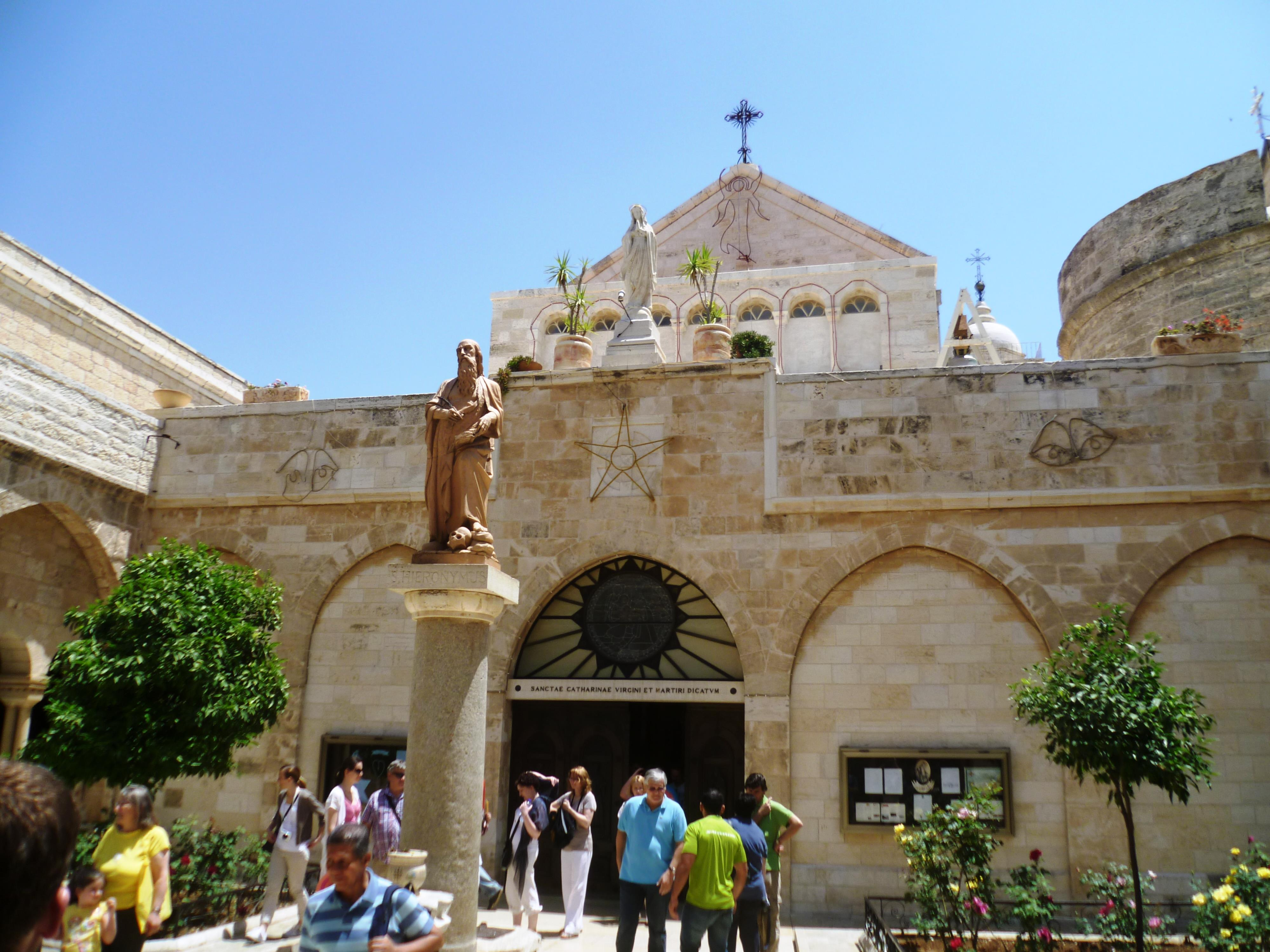
- Church of Saint Catherine
- 31°42′16.4″N 35°12′28.0″E
- Location: Bethlehem, West Bank
- Country: Palestine
- Denomination: Catholic Church

The Church of Saint Catherine or Chapel of Saint Catherine (Latin: Ecclesia Sanctae Catharinae, Arabic: كنيسة القديسة كترينا, Hebrew: כנסיית קתרינה הקדושה) is a Catholic religious building located adjacent to the northern part of the Basilica of the Nativity in Bethlehem in the West Bank, Palestine. It works as a parish church and Franciscan monastery. There is a complex of caves underneath the church.

It is administered by the Latin Patriarchate of Jerusalem, follows the Roman Rite, and is included in the UNESCO World Heritage List since 2012 as part of the "Birthplace of Jesus" World Heritage Site.

== History ==
=== Byzantine period ===
St Jerome's monastery was possibly located at the site of the medieval cloister, its foundations laying hidden under the current pavement laid by Barluzzi.

=== Crusader period ===
Augustinian monastery.

=== Mamluk period ===
A small chapel, located near the site of the current altar of St Catherine of Alexandria, was dedicated to the Alexandrine saint in 1347 as part of the Franciscan monastery. The church is first mentioned in the 15th century.

=== Late Ottoman period ===
The church in its current shape is the result of work from the 19th century. It is built in Neo-Gothic style. It was extended in 1881 with funds provided by Emperor Franz Joseph I of Austria-Hungary.

=== After World War II ===
The Crusader-period cloister was restored in 1948 by Italian architect Antonio Barluzzi.

== Connection to St Catherine ==
The medieval chapel was built at the alleged site of Jesus' apparition to St Catherine, where he announced her of her coming martyrdom.

== Televised Christmas Mass ==
This is the church where the Latin Patriarch of Jerusalem celebrates Midnight Mass on Christmas Eve.

== Relic of the Holy Crib ==
Tradition has it that Patriarch Sophronius of Jerusalem has sent the relics of the wooden manger in which Jesus was born to Pope Theodore I in the 640s, soon after the Muslim capture of Jerusalem. Others claim that it was Empress Helena who brought the relic (see her 326-28 pilgrimage). The pieces of wood, known as the Holy Crib (sacra culla or cunabulum), have been kept in the Basilica of Santa Maria Maggiore in Rome. Shortly before Christmas 2019, Pope Francis has sent a small fragment to Bethlehem via Jerusalem, after specialists extracted it from the larger relic. It has since been venerated at St Catherine's, where it is meant to remain "forever", at a side altar of the southern nave.

== Gallery ==
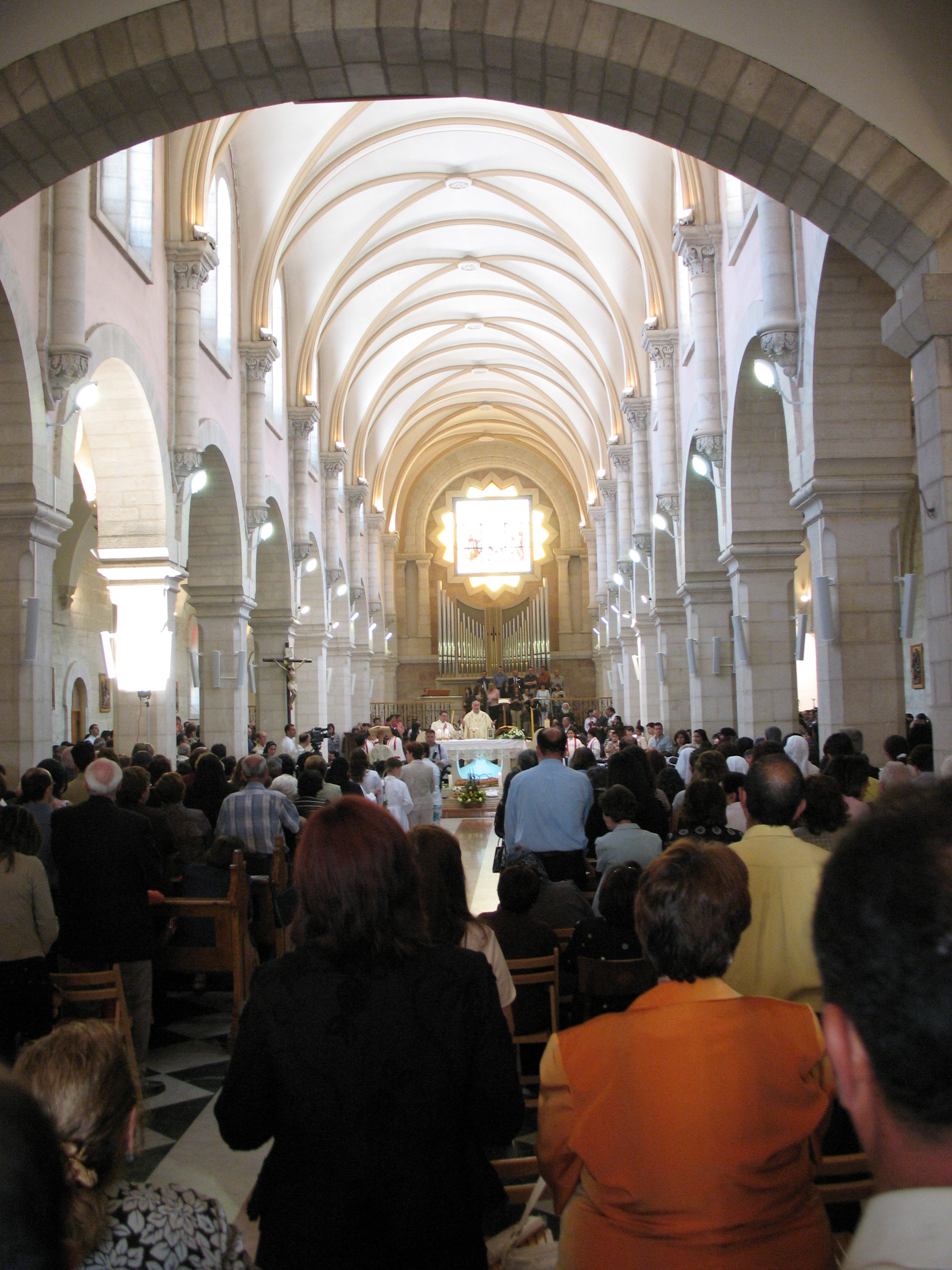
Catholic Mass in the church

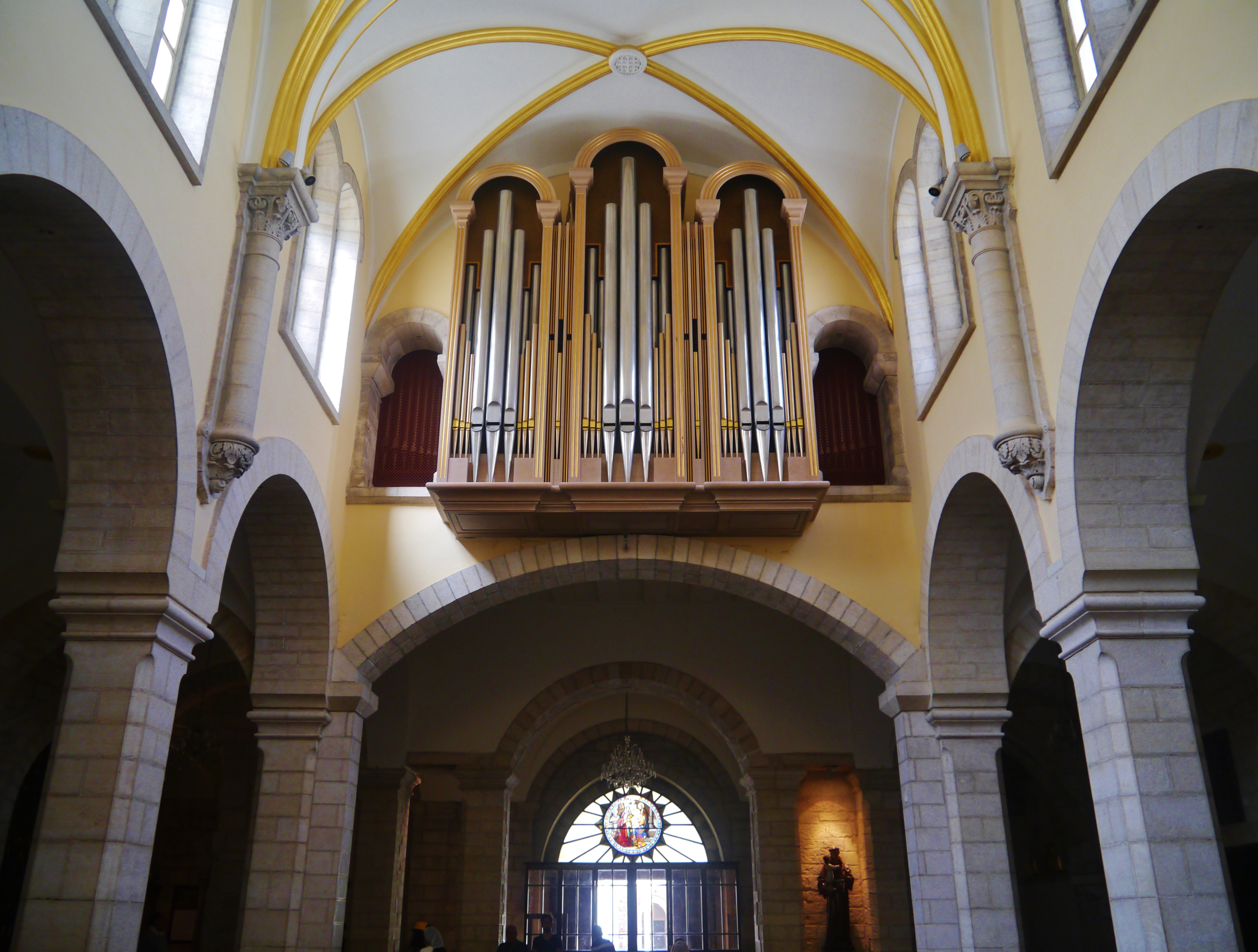
The organ of St. Catherine

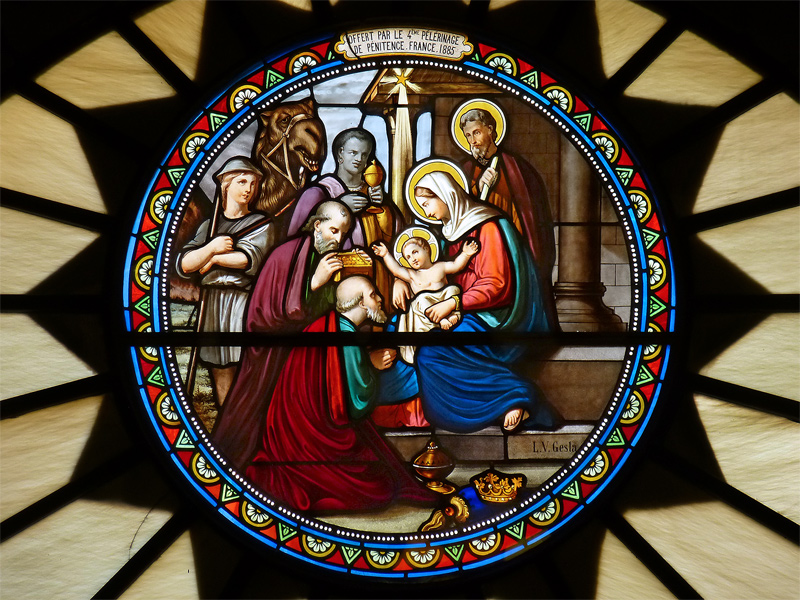
One of the stained glass windows

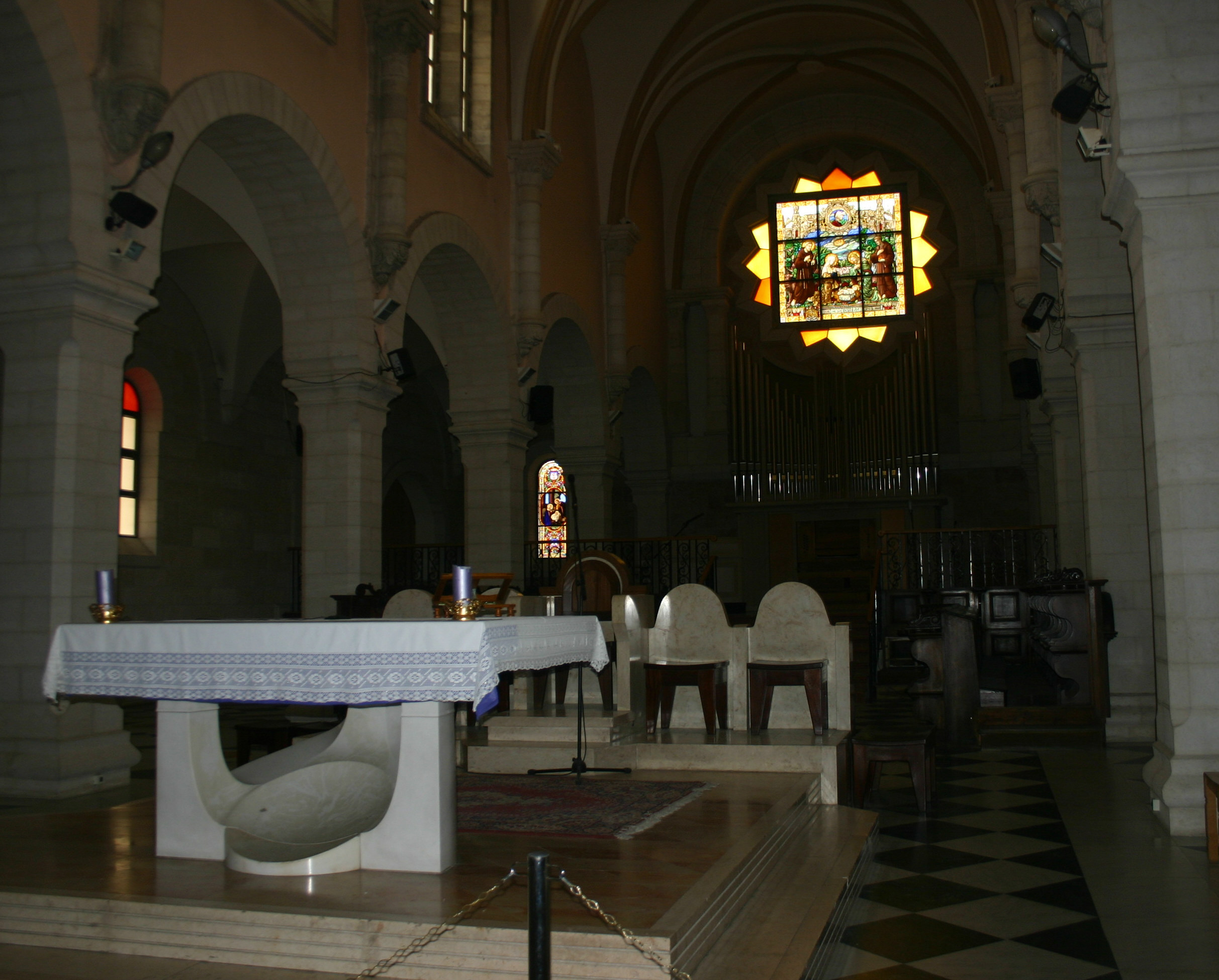
View from the main altar

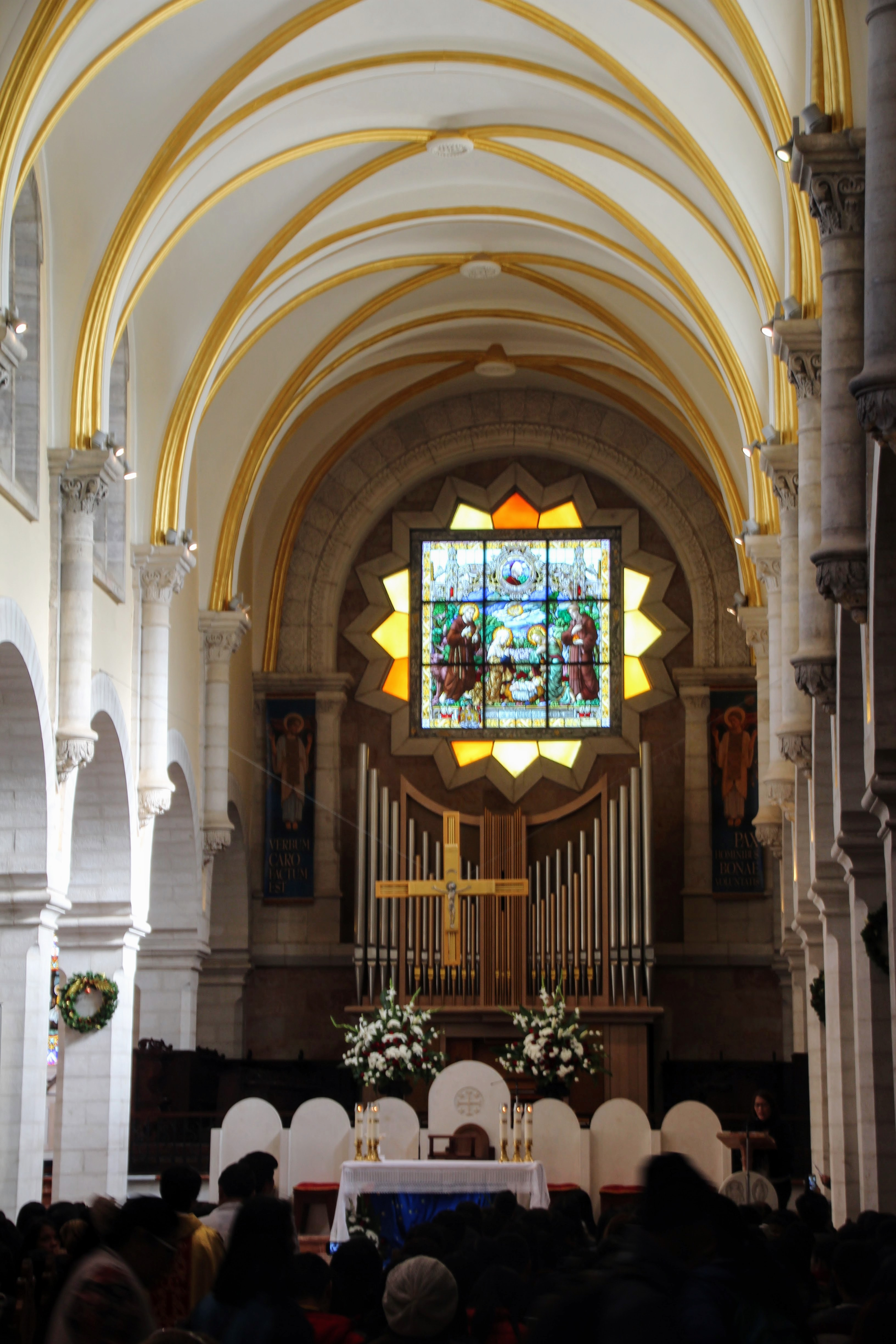
Main altar

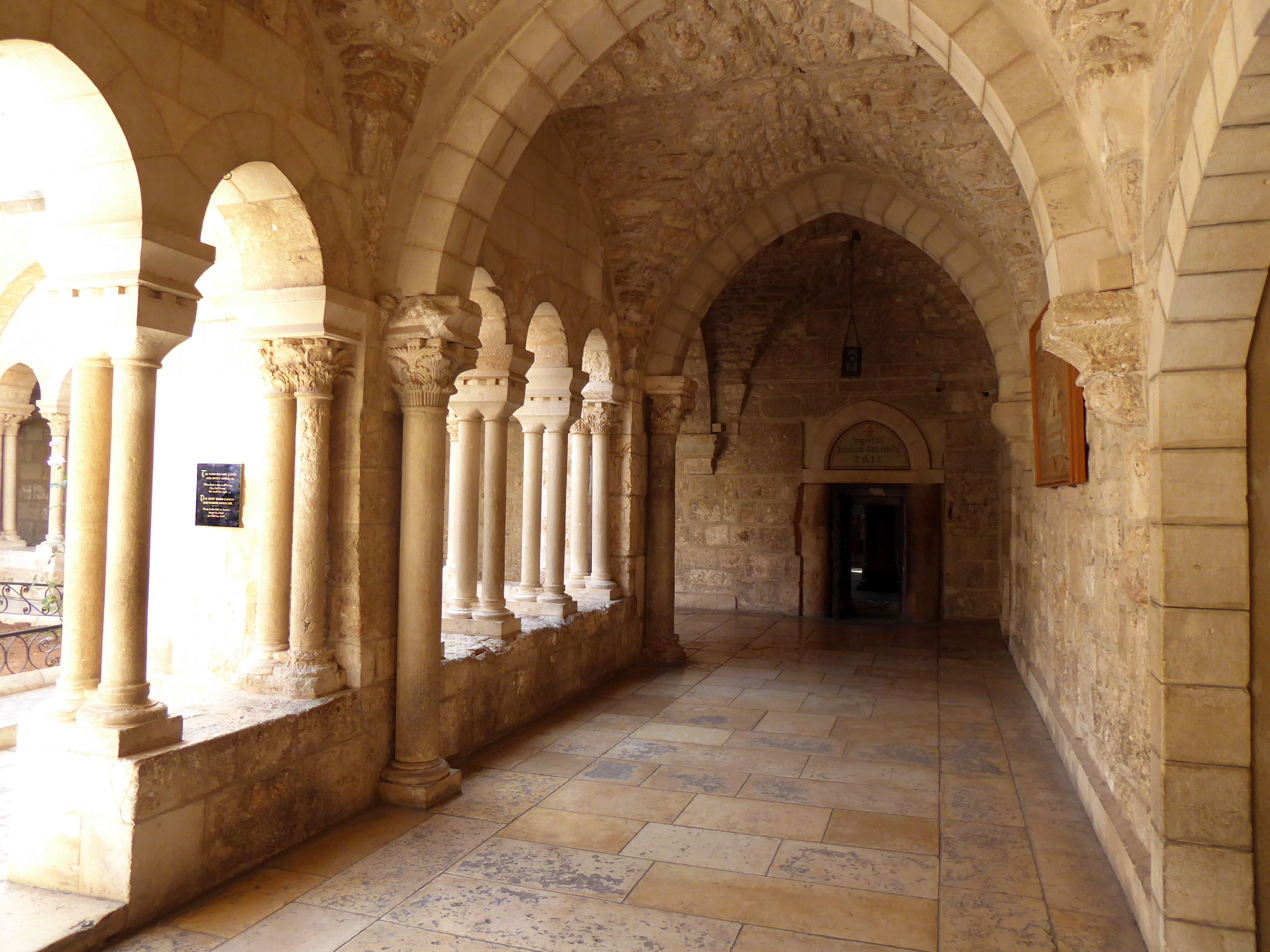
Restored medieval cloister

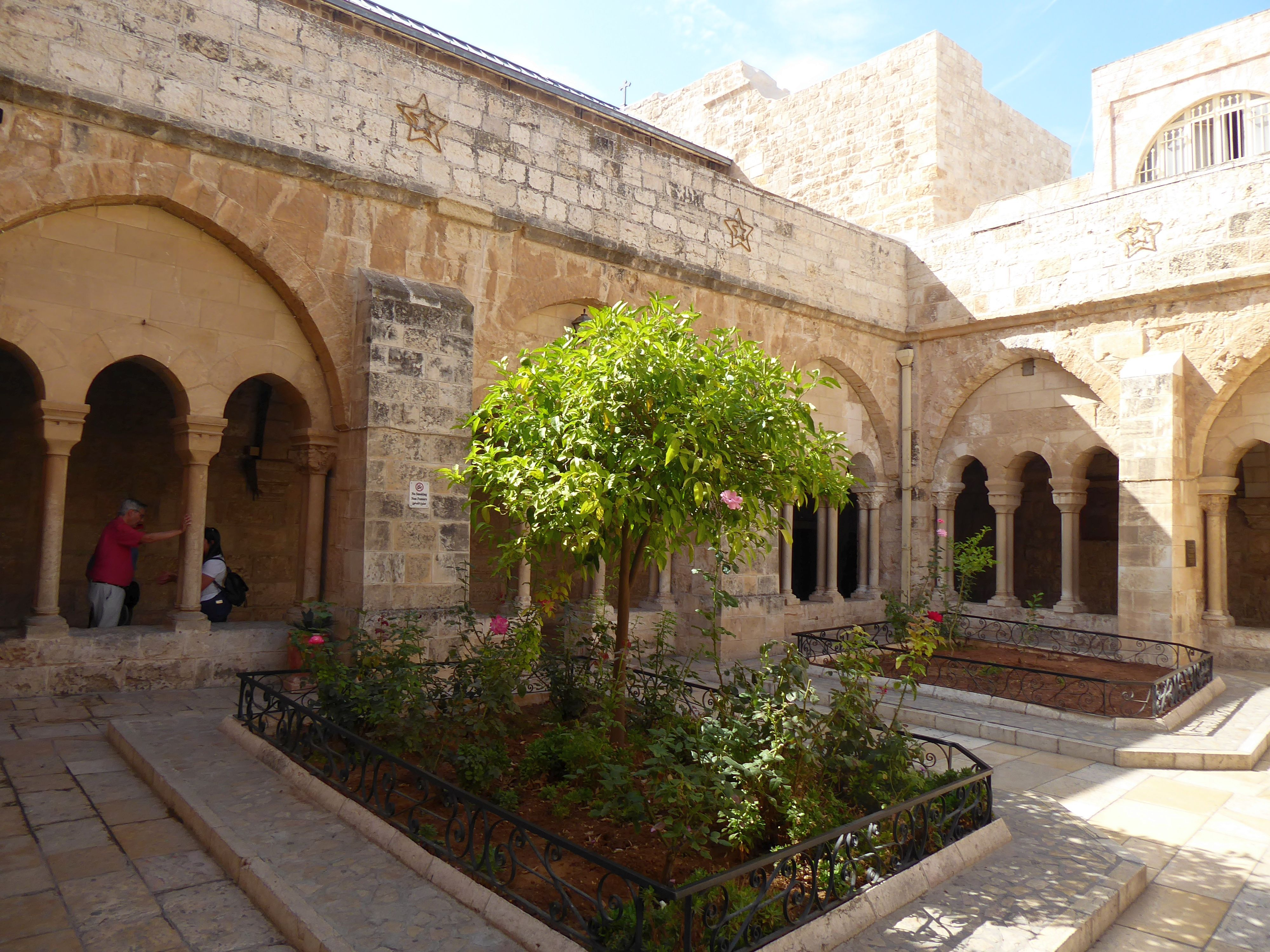
Restored medieval cloister and courtyard

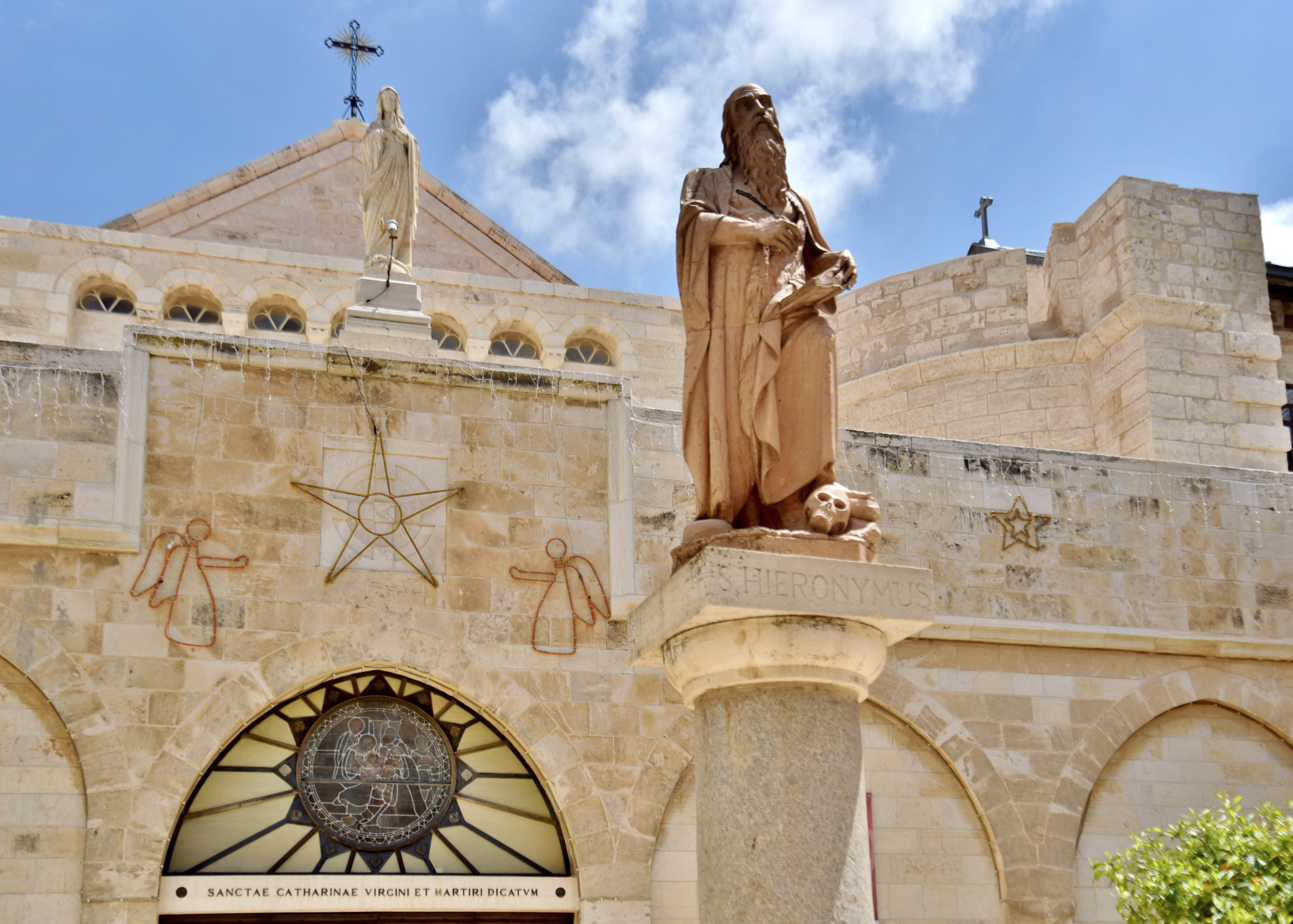

== See also ==
- Catholic Church in Palestine
