= Caterina Sordini =

Italian Roman Catholic professed religious

Blessed Caterina Soderini
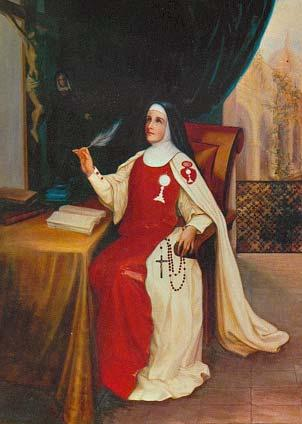

Religious
- Born: 16 April 1770; Porto Santo Stefano, Grosseto, Grand Duchy of Tuscany
- Died: 29 November 1824 (aged 54); Rome, Papal States
- Venerated in: Roman Catholic Church
- Beatified: 3 May 2008, Basilica of Saint John Lateran, Rome, Italy by Cardinal José Saraiva Martins
- Feast: 29 April
- Attributes: Religious habit; Heart; With the Blessed Sacrament
- Patronage: Sisters of Perpetual Adoration

Caterina Sordini (16 April 1770 – 29 November 1824) was an Italian Roman Catholic professed religious that established the Sisters of Perpetual Adoration, in latin Adoratrices Perpetuae Sanctissimi Sacramenti, devoted to the Eucharist. She assumed the religious name of "Maria Maddalena of the Incarnation" when she became a member of the Third Order of Saint Francis during her adolescence.

She was forced out of Rome as a result of Napoleon Bonaparte's invasion of the Italian peninsula but returned following his defeat and the return of Pope Pius VII to Rome. The pope proved to be a benefactor for Sordini's order and something that Pope Leo XII continued; however his involvement was to a lesser extent than that of his immediate predecessor.

Sordini died in 1824 and was beatified at the Basilica of Saint John Lateran in 2008 after Pope Benedict XVI approved her beatification.

== Life ==
Caterina Sordini was born in Porto Santo Stefano on 16 April 1770 as the fourth of nine children to Lorenzo Sordini and Teresa Moizzo. She was baptized on 18 April 1770 with the names of Caterina Francesca Maria Antonia and her godparents were Bartolomeo and Maria Anna Giovine Schiano. She was a curious and self-conscious child who also could be rude at times.

At the age of seventeen her father arranged her to wed a maritime merchant named Alfonso Capece. Sordini was against this idea but later relented to the wishes of her father. The merchant she was to meet was soon to depart for Constantinople but met with Sordini before his departure. He gave her a casket of jewels and she adorned herself in them prior to admiring her reflection in the mirror. But she did not see herself for she saw the crucified Jesus Christ who asked her: "You would give Me up for a carnal creature?"

Sordini considered the words of the Crucified Christ and - in February 1788 - visited a convent of the Third Order of Saint Francis in Ischia di Castro and entered it almost as soon as she arrived. This move shocked her father who believed it was nothing more than a mere visit and relented to his daughter's wishes upon the realization that it was fundamental to her. After eight months as a postulant, she was clothed in the Franciscan order habit for the first time on 26 October 1788 and assumed her new name of "Maria Maddalena of the Incarnation".(Maria Maddalena dell'Incarnazione).

On one occasion on 19 February 1789 she fell into a state of ecstasy and saw - as she described - "Jesus seated on a throne of grace in the Blessed Sacrament, surrounded by virgins adoring Him". She also heard Christ tell her: "I have chosen you to establish the work of perpetual adorers who, day and night, will offer Me their humble adoration". It was around 1799 that she met the priest Giovanni Antonio Baldeschi would become her spiritual director. In response to her vision she established what would be the name of the Sisters of Perpetual Adoration and in their first general chapter on 20 April 1802 was appointed as its abbess.

On 21 November 1803 Charles Emmanuel IV of Sardinia visited Sordini's congregation and had a private conversation with her for around two hours.

Sordini drafted the Rule with the consent of her local bishop and spiritual director and set out for Rome on 31 May 1807. It was at that time that Pope Pius VII allowed them to establish their first house in Rome. On 8 July 1807 she moved into the Ss. Joachim and Anne convent near the Trevi Fountain. Cardinal Giulio Maria della Somaglia - on 2 February 1808 - was scheduled to go to the Capella Papale in the Quirinale Palace but an invisible force held him back despite his attempts to leave the room. Somaglia thought on this strange occurrence and realized his lack of signing Sordini's rule was the reason. He was able to leave the room once he signed it. The congregation - and Sordini also - was forced into exile in the region of Tuscany following Napoleon Bonaparte's invasion of the Italian peninsula. In her exile she formed a new group but was allowed to return to Rome less than a decade later on 19 March 1814 after Napoleon's defeat and settled at Sant'Anna al Qurinale. The pope later returned to Rome on 24 May 1814 and granted his formal approval to the new institute on 13 February 1818. But papal approval of the Rule did not come until 22 July 1818 in the papal bull "In Supremo Militantis".

Five months before this the pontiff had appointed Bishop Giuseppe Bartolomeo Menochio as their guide and superior. In his presence she and three other sisters made their solemn vows in her order on 12 May 1818. The death of Monochio on 25 March 1823 led to the appointment of their new superior in the form of Cardinal Annibale della Genga - future pontiff - who was not sympathetic to the congregation in the slightest. Della Genga's ascension as Pope Leo XII worried the sisters though Sordini exhorted them to have confidence and assured them the new pope would look after them. This came to pass for Leo XII proved generous to them; this continued with his successors Pope Gregory XVI and Pope Pius IX - after Sordini's death - who bestowed the sisters with privileges.

In 1824 she predicted she would die in the autumn despite the fact that she was not taken at her word. She died at 11:00pm on 29 November 1824 and was buried in Sant'Anna al Qurinale. Her remains were relocated in 1839 to the Church of Santa Maria Maddalena and again - though in the same church - in 1968. Her remains were moved to an altar dedicated to her in the same church on 28 January 2004. Sordini's order now operates across Europe as well as in Africa.

== Beatification ==
The beatification process commenced with two processes that would be held: one in Naples and one in Rome. The informative process in Rome opened in 1845 and concluded its work in 1851 upon taking all documentation available and testimonies that would further support the cause. From that it stalled and remained inactive for decades until reopening on 7 July 1926. A decree on her writings was issued on 11 September 1980. The decree approved the fact that - upon the inspection of theologians - her writings were aligned with doctrine and did not spread heresies nor contradict official teachings.

The decree on the previous informative process - that had closed decades before - was issued on 26 April 1985 and confirmed that the process had completed its work. The postulation compiled the Positio in 1990 and sent it to the Congregation for the Causes of Saints in Rome for their own investigation. The dossier included biographical details amongst other things.

On 24 April 2001 she was granted the title of Venerable after Pope John Paul II acknowledged the fact that Sordini had lived a model life of heroic virtue.

The miracle needed for her beatification opened in Culiacan on 1 August 2001 with the sole task of testimonies from those involved and all medical reports and documents to prove the healing was indeed a miracle. The process closed on 20 October 2001 and was sent to Rome for additional evaluation; the process was approved and ratified on 4 October 2002. The Rome-based medical board met and approved the miracle on 14 October 2002 and passed it on to the consulting theologians who also approved the healing as a miracle on 28 June 2005. The C.C.S. approved it also on 16 October 2007 and passed it to Pope Benedict XVI on 17 December 2007 for his approval.

The beatification was celebrated on 3 May 2008 in the Basilica of Saint John Lateran in Rome. Cardinal José Saraiva Martins presided over the celebration on the behalf of Benedict XVI. Other significant individuals - such as Cardinal Camillo Ruini - were in attendance.

The current postulator assigned to the cause is the Conventual Franciscan Ernesto Piacentini.
