= Catholic Church in Palestine =

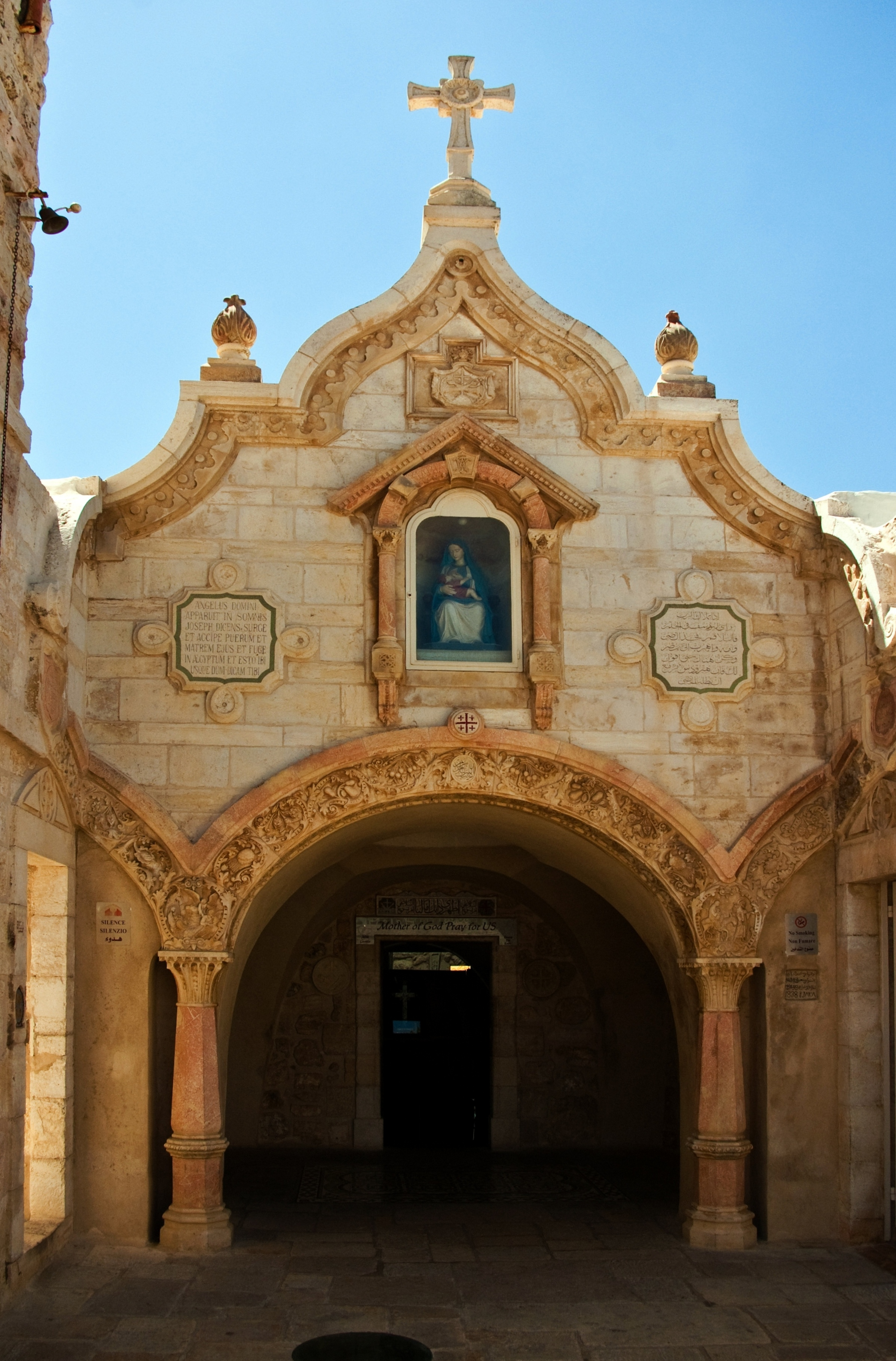
The Chapel of the Milk Grotto, located in Bethlehem

The Catholic Church in Palestine is part of the worldwide Catholic Church, under the spiritual leadership of the Pope in Rome.

There are over 80,000 Catholics in the State of Palestine (including Jerusalem), mostly in the agglomeration between Ramallah and Bethlehem, including the West Bank suburbs of Jerusalem. Adherents are mostly of the Latin Church, but there are also small communities of the Melkite Catholic Patriarchate of Antioch and Jerusalem, belonging to the Melkite Catholic Church, as well as the Maronite Church. All three are in full communion with the Holy See as part of the worldwide Catholic Church.

There are two archbishops of Jerusalem, one for each jurisdiction. The jurisdiction of the Latin Patriarchate of Jerusalem in Jerusalem and the Palestinian territories includes 17 parishes, two of which are in Jerusalem. The current Latin Patriarch of Jerusalem is Pierbattista Pizzaballa.

The Melkite Greek Catholic jurisdiction includes 8 parishes (one in Jerusalem). The current Melkite archbishop is Yasser Ayyash.

== History ==
=== Early Christianity ===
The land of Palestine has a long history with Catholicism and Christianity dating back 2,000 years. Jesus lived and preached in Judea and Galilee, today's West Bank and Israel. After the Crucifixion of Jesus, Jerusalem became a hub for the first followers of Christianity. Despite that, the prosecution of Christians in the Roman Empire only intensified, until the Edict of Milan, which granted religious freedom. By the time the Byzantine Empire arose, Palestine had already become a thriving Christian center, with thousands of annual pilgrims and many churches and monasteries were built in that time.

=== Islamic conquest and the Crusader Period ===
After a series of wars between the Byzantine Empire and the Sasanian Empire, the region of the Middle East had been left weakened and that presented the perfect opportunity for the Rashidun Caliphate to strike. In 638 AD, the Muslim armies finally conquered Jerusalem. The Christians were granted Dhimmi status, which theoretically meant that they would be protected and respected, but wouldn't have the same rights as Muslims.

In 1054, during the schism, the Patriarchate of Jerusalem aligned with Constantinople, choosing Orthodoxy over Catholicism.

In 1099, the crusaders of the First Crusade managed to capture Jerusalem and the Holy Lands and installed Latin rule. Roman Catholic clergy replaced Orthodox ones, contributing to the restoration of Catholicism in the region. In 1187, Saladin recaptured Jerusalem, but tolerated the Christians in the Holy Lands.

=== Mamluk and Ottoman Rule ===
In 1291, Palestine came under Mamluk rule. They restored Islamic authority and eliminated Catholic influence by expelling the Latin population.

After 1517, the Ottoman Empire conquered the entirety of the Mamluk Sultanate, which included the land of Palestine within its territory. The Ottomans allowed Christians enjoy more freedom than previous caliphates. Additionally, foreign powers stepped in to become guardians of the Christians in the empire, with the populations of Palestine, Syria and the Levant set to be protected by France. This gave Palestinian Christians protection privileges and access to missionary schools, which enabled them to engage in commerce with European traders. In addition, Christian merchants had lower rates of duty to pay than their Muslim counterparts, and thus they established themselves as bankers and moneylenders for Muslim landowners, artisans and peasants. This growing middle class produced several newspaper owners and editors and played leading roles in Palestinian political life.

The Latin Patriarchate of Jerusalem was finally re-established in 1847 by Pope Pius IX, after 660 years since the fall to Saladin. This re-establishment marked a significant moment in the history of the Latin Church in Jerusalem, restoring the position of the Latin Patriarchate after centuries of Muslim rule.

=== Modern Day ===
In 1920, the British Mandate of Palestine was put in place with a task to apply the Balfour Declaration and make Palestine the Jews' "homeland". Both the Catholics and Christians in their entirety, along with the Muslims stood united against the idea of Zionism in the region and set up Muslim-Christian Associations.

After World War II, with tensions between the Jews and Arabs reaching a breaking point, the United Nations drafted the Palestine partition plan to include the separate states of Israel and Palestine.

In the next years, Catholic (and broader Christian) numbers in Palestine declined. The Nakba left Arab Christians in disarray. At Iqrit and Bir'im, the IDF ordered Christians to "temporarily" evacuate, an order that was then confirmed as a permanent expulsion. In the Galilee, more lenience was applied to the Christians where expulsion mostly affected Muslims: at Tarshiha, Mi'elya, Dayr al-Qassi, and Salaban, Christians were allowed to remain while Muslims were driven out. In his 1949 encyclical Redemptoris nostri cruciatus (published directly after the 1948 War), Pope Pius XII demanded greater protection and care to be directed towards Palestinians and Christian holy sites in Israel/Palestine.

After the war, the Christian population in the West Bank, under Jordanian control, dropped slightly, largely due to economic problems. This contrasts with the process occurring in Israel where Christians left en masse after 1948. These trends accelerated after the 1967 war in the aftermath of Israel's takeover of the West Bank and Gaza.

Pope Francis had consistent contact with the Holy Family Church (the only Roman Catholic Church in Gaza) throughout his papacy during the ongoing Israeli invasion and occupation of Gaza.

== See also ==
- Catholic Church in Israel
- Catholic Church in the Middle East
- Palestinian Christians
- Caritas Jerusalem
- Latin Patriarchate of Jerusalem
- List of parishes of the Latin Patriarchate of Jerusalem
- Our Lady of Palestine
- Custody of the Holy Land
- Latin Church in the Middle East
- Catholic Near East Welfare Association
