= Custody of the Holy Land =

Province of the Order of Friars Minor

Coordinates: 31.7791°N 35.2275°E

- Latin: Custodia Terræ Sanctæ
- Coat of arms of the Custody of the Holy Land
- Formation: 1217
- Founder: Francis of Assisi
- Founded at: Porziuncola, Assisi, Umbria
- Purpose: "The grace of the Holy Places"
- Headquarters: Monastery of Saint Saviour
- Location: Old City of Jerusalem
- Region served: Holy Land; Middle East
- Services: Fathers of the Holy Sepulchre
- Custos: Francesco Ielpo (2025-)
- Custodial Vicar: Dobromir Jasztal (2013–2022)
- General Secretary: Marco Carrara
- Parent organization: Order of Friars Minor
- Affiliations: Latin Patriarchate of Jerusalem; Order of the Holy Sepulchre
- Website: www.custodia.org

The Custody of the Holy Land (Latin: Custodia Terræ Sanctæ) is a custodian priory of the Order of Friars Minor in Jerusalem, founded as the Province of the Holy Land in 1217 by Saint Francis of Assisi, who had also founded the Franciscan Order in 1209. In 1342, the Franciscans were declared by two papal bulls as the official custodians of the Holy Places in the name of the Catholic Church.

The Custody headquarters are located in the Monastery of Saint Saviour, a 16th-century Franciscan monastery near the New Gate in the Old City of Jerusalem. The office can bestow—only to those entering its office—the Jerusalem Pilgrim's Cross upon deserving Catholic visitors to the city.

The Franciscans trace their presence in the Holy Land to 1217. By 1229, the friars had a small house near the fifth station of the Via Dolorosa and in 1272 were permitted to settle in the Cenacle on Mount Zion. In 1309 they also settled in Bethlehem and the Holy Sepulchre along with the Canons Regular.

After the final fall of the second Crusader Kingdom of Jerusalem in 1291, the title of Latin Patriarch of Jerusalem was vested in the Custody ex officio in Rome, while resuming its activities in the Holy Land, including surveilling the accolades of the Order of the Holy Sepulchre 1342–1489 until its Grand Magistry was vested in the papacy. Following the restoration of the Latin Patriarchate of Jerusalem as residential episcopal see in 1847, the Patriarch henceforth additionally assumed the position of the order's ecclesiastical superior, eventually supplanting the Custody of the Holy Land as Grand Prior of the Order of the Holy Sepulchre.

The Custody of the Holy Land has repeatedly expressed concern about the survival of the Christians in the Holy Land, including the strained situation for Christians in the rest of the Middle East. Between 2004 and 2016, the Custodial Curia was led by Custos Fr. Pierbattista Pizzaballa. Francesco Patton was appointed as Father Custos of the Holy Land in 2016, and he was reconfirmed in 2022. He was followed in 2025 by Francesco Ielpo.

== Mission ==
The mission of the Custody of the Holy Land is to guard "the grace of the Holy Places" of the Holy Land and the rest of the Middle East, "sanctified by the presence of Jesus", as well as pilgrims visiting them, on behalf of the Catholic Church.

== History ==
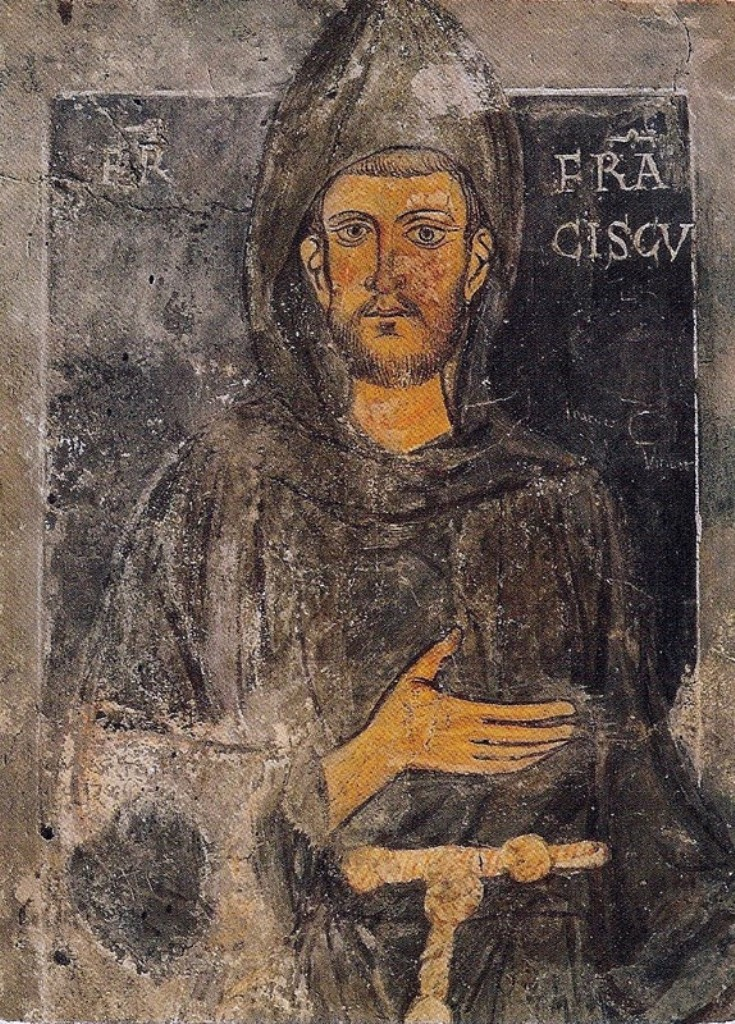
Oldest known portrait in existence of Saint Francis of Assisi, who founded the Order of Friars Minor and its Custody of the Holy Land, dating back to his retreat to Subiaco (1223–1224); depicted without the stigmata.

An online history, The Franciscan Presence in the Holy Land, has been prepared by the Custodian Emeritus (later Latin Patriarch of Jerusalem), Pierbattista Pizzaballa, OFM.

The Franciscan presence in the Holy Land started in 1217, when the province of Syria was established, with Frater (Brother) Elias of Cortona as Minister. By 1229, the friars had a small house near the fifth station of the Via Dolorosa. In 1272 the Sultan Baibars of Egypt permitted the Franciscans to settle in the Cenacle (also called the Upper Room) on Mount Sion. Later on, in 1309, they also settled in Bethlehem and in the Holy Sepulchre, along with the Canons Regular.

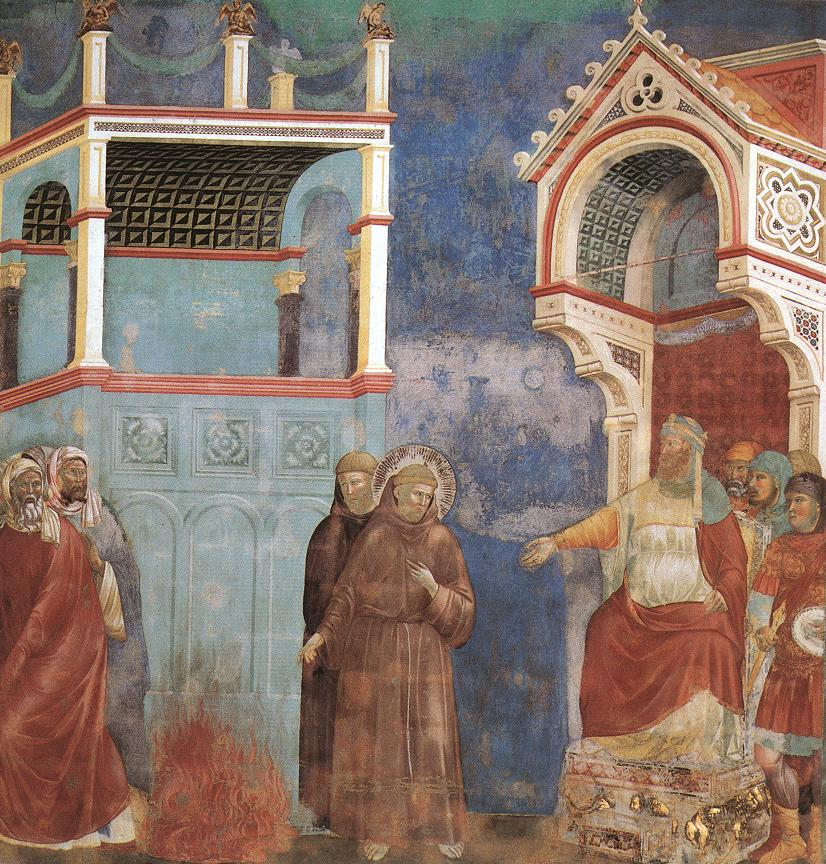
Saint Francis before Sultan Al-Kamil of Egypt, witnessing the trial by fire (wall fresco, Giotto)

In 1333, Robert d'Anjou, King of Naples, and his wife, Sancia of Majorca, bought the Cenacle from the Sultan of Egypt and gave it to the Franciscans. In 1342, Pope Clement VI, by the Papal bulls Gratiam agimus and Nuper charissimae declared the Franciscans as the official custodians of the Holy Places in the name of the Catholic Church. A portion reads:

A short time ago good news from the king and queen reached our Apostolic See relating that, at great cost and following difficult negotiations, they had obtained a concession from the Sultan of Babylon [that is, Cairo], who to the intense shame of Christians occupies the Holy Sepulchre of the Lord and the other Holy Places beyond the sea that were sanctified by the blood of this same Redeemer, to wit that friars of your Order may reside continuously in the church known as the Sepulchre and celebrate there Solemn Sung Masses and the Divine Office in the manner of the several friars of this Order who are already present in this place; moreover, this same Sultan has also conceded to the King and Queen the Cenacle of the Lord, the chapel where the Holy Spirit was manifested to the Apostles and the other chapel in which Christ appeared to the Apostles after his resurrection, in the presence of Blessed Thomas; and also the news of how the Queen built a convent on Mount Zion where, as is known, the Cenacle and the said chapels are located; where for some time she has had the intention of supporting twelve friars of your Order to assure the divine Liturgy in the church of the Holy Sepulchre, along with three laymen charged with serving the friars and seeing to their needs.

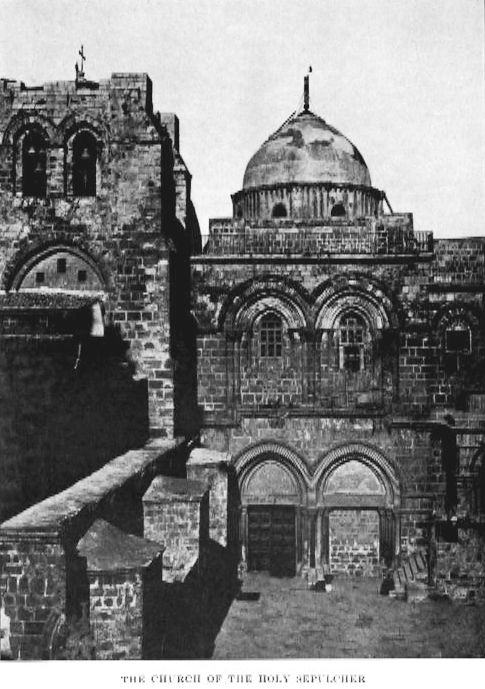
Church of the Holy Sepulchre (1885). Other than some restoration work, its appearance has essentially not changed since 1854. The Immovable Ladder, the small ladder below the top-right window, is also visible in recent photographs; this has remained in the same position since 1754 over a disagreement to remove it.

The Custodian was described as the "Guardian of Mount Zion in Jerusalem". Between 1342 and 1489, the Custodian was the head of the Order of the Holy Sepulchre and held the ex officio title of Latin Patriarch of Jerusalem. From 1374, he was based at the Basilica di San Lorenzo fuori le Mura in Rome.

In 1489, Pope Innocent VIII suppressed the Order of the Holy Sepulchre and ruled that it was to be merged with the Knights Hospitaller. In 1496, Pope Alexander VI, restored the Order of Holy Sepulchre to independent status, but the Custodian ceased to be the head of the Order. Instead, a Grand Master of the Order was created, and the office vested in the papacy. The Custodian continued to act as the Latin Patriarch of Jerusalem ex officio until 1830, and by being appointed to both offices until 1905. The office of Grand Master remained vested in the papacy until 1949. On 29 August 2011, Archbishop Edwin Frederick O'Brien was appointed by Pope Benedict XVI Grand Master to succeed Cardinal John Patrick Foley, who resigned the office on 24 February 2011 due to ill health. The Order is a member of many international bodies and has observer status at others (such as the United Nations). The Grand Master is a papal viceroy who assists Vatican diplomacy with procedural support for making motions, proposing amendments and requiring votes in the sphere of international diplomacy.

Franciscan friars cared for the Cenacle, restoring also the building with Gothic vaults, until the Ottoman Empire captured Jerusalem and banished all Christians. After the Franciscan friars' eviction, the Cenacle was transformed into a mosque. Christians were not allowed to use the room for prayer until the establishment of the State of Israel in 1948.

In 1623, the Latin Province of the Holy Land was split into a number of smaller entities, called Custodies – creating Custodies of Cyprus, Syria, and the Holy Land proper. The Custody of the Holy Land included the monasteries of Saint-Jean-d'Acre, Antioch, Sidon, Tyre, Jerusalem and Jaffa.

In 1847, a resident Latin Patriarchate of Jerusalem was restored in the Holy Land, together with the Order of the Holy Sepulchre. The Latin Patriarch of Jerusalem became the ecclesiastical superior of the Order, and eventually assumed the title Grand Prior, supplanting the Custodian. The office of Grand Master still remained vested in the papacy.

During the difficult years of the Great War, many friars belonging to the enemy nations fighting against the Ottomans and Germans were deported. In 1917, when the Italian friars were just about to be sent away, reprieve came in the last minute, which was attributed to the triduum celebrated that year in honour of St Anthony of Padua, a saint venerated for his miracles. Consequently, in 1920, St Anthony was chosen as the patron saint of the Custody.

In 1937, Alberto Gori was appointed Custodian of the Holy Land, an office he would occupy until 1949, when he was appointed Latin Patriarch of Jerusalem, an office he held until 1970. In Gori's reports to the Vatican in the 1940s, he was critical of Jewish and later Israeli forces, whom he accused of destruction of holy places. Despite repeated Israeli assurances that Israel will guarantee freedom of religion and safeguard the Holy Places of all religions, Pope Pius XII issued several encyclicals expressing concerns about the holy places as well as access. In 1949, at the time of appointing Gori to the office of Latin Patriarch, Pius XII also relinquished the title of Grand Master.

== Organisation ==
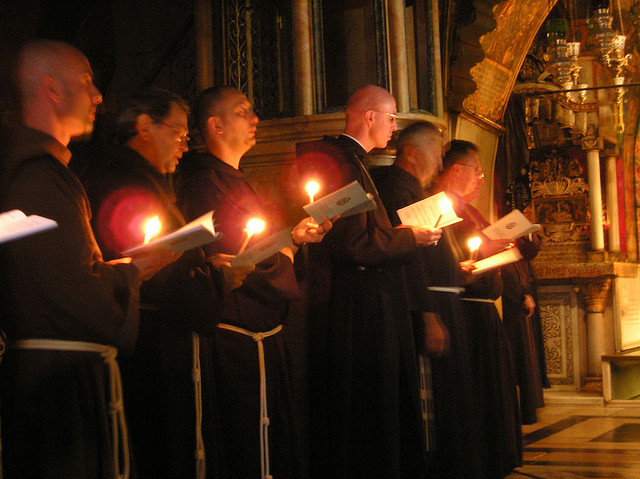
Franciscan monks during the procession on the Calvary in the Church of the Holy Sepulchre(2006).

=== Leadership ===
On 15 May 2004, Fr. Pierbattista Pizzaballa was appointed Custodian of the Holy Land, succeeding Giovanni Battistelli, who held the office for six years. On Friday, 28 June 2013, Pope Francis confirmed that he would continue as Custodian for at least a further three years. Pierbattista Pizzaballa was born in Cologno al Serio, Italy, on 21 April 1965. He was ordained a priest in September 1990. Starting from 2016, the chief custodian has been Francesco Patton. In 2025, Francesco Ielpo was appointed as his follower.

The Custodian of the Holy Land, also called the International Custodian of the Holy Land, is appointed by the General Definitorium of the Order of Friars Minor (OFM) of the Franciscans and approved by the Pope and the Holy See.

=== Jurisdiction ===
The Custodian has the role of Minister Provincial (i.e. major superior) of the Franciscans living in Israel, Palestine, Jordan, Syria, Lebanon, parts of Egypt, Cyprus and Rhodes.

=== Friars and sisters ===
The Custody has about 300 friars and about 100 sisters in these countries. The Franciscans serve the principal Christian shrines, including the Church of the Holy Sepulchre in Jerusalem, Basilica of the Nativity in Bethlehem and the Basilica of the Annunciation in Nazareth.

=== Properties in the Holy Land ===
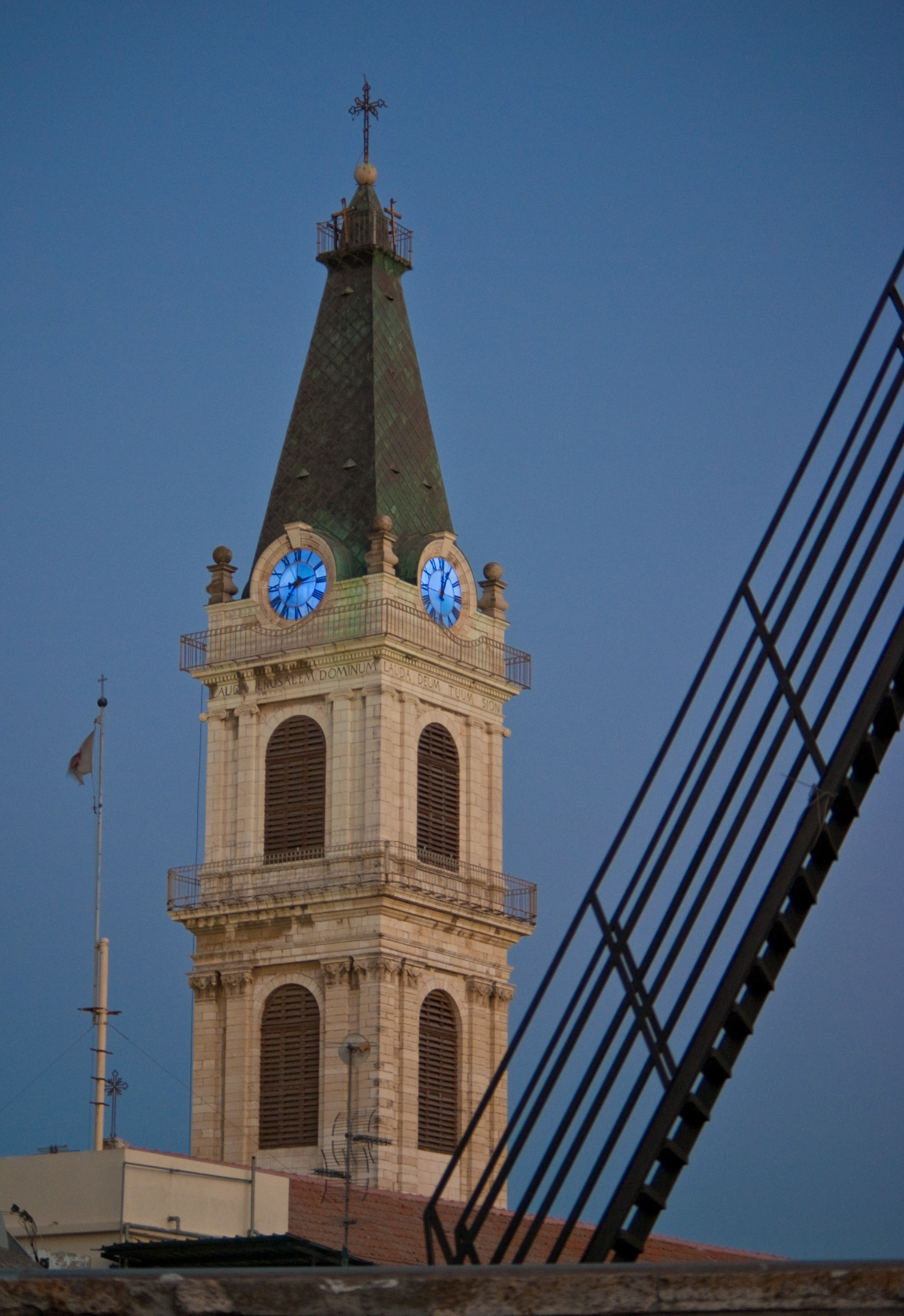
The church of the Monastery of Saint Saviour in Jerusalem.

The Franciscan order owns a great deal of property in the Holy Land, second only to the Orthodox Church of Jerusalem. In addition to the major shrines of the Church of the Holy Sepulchre in Jerusalem and the Basilica of the Nativity in Bethlehem, which the Franciscans own and administer in common with the Jerusalem Orthodox and Armenian Orthodox patriarchates, the Custodian also cares for 74 shrines and sanctuaries throughout the Holy Land, including properties in Syria and Jordan.

In 1909, in the territory of the Latin Patriarchate of Jerusalem, re-instituted in 1847, the Franciscans had 24 convents and 15 parishes, including numerous schools.

The Custodian's offices are at the Monastery of St Saviour, a 16th-century Franciscan monastery near New Gate in the Old City of Jerusalem.

== Activities ==
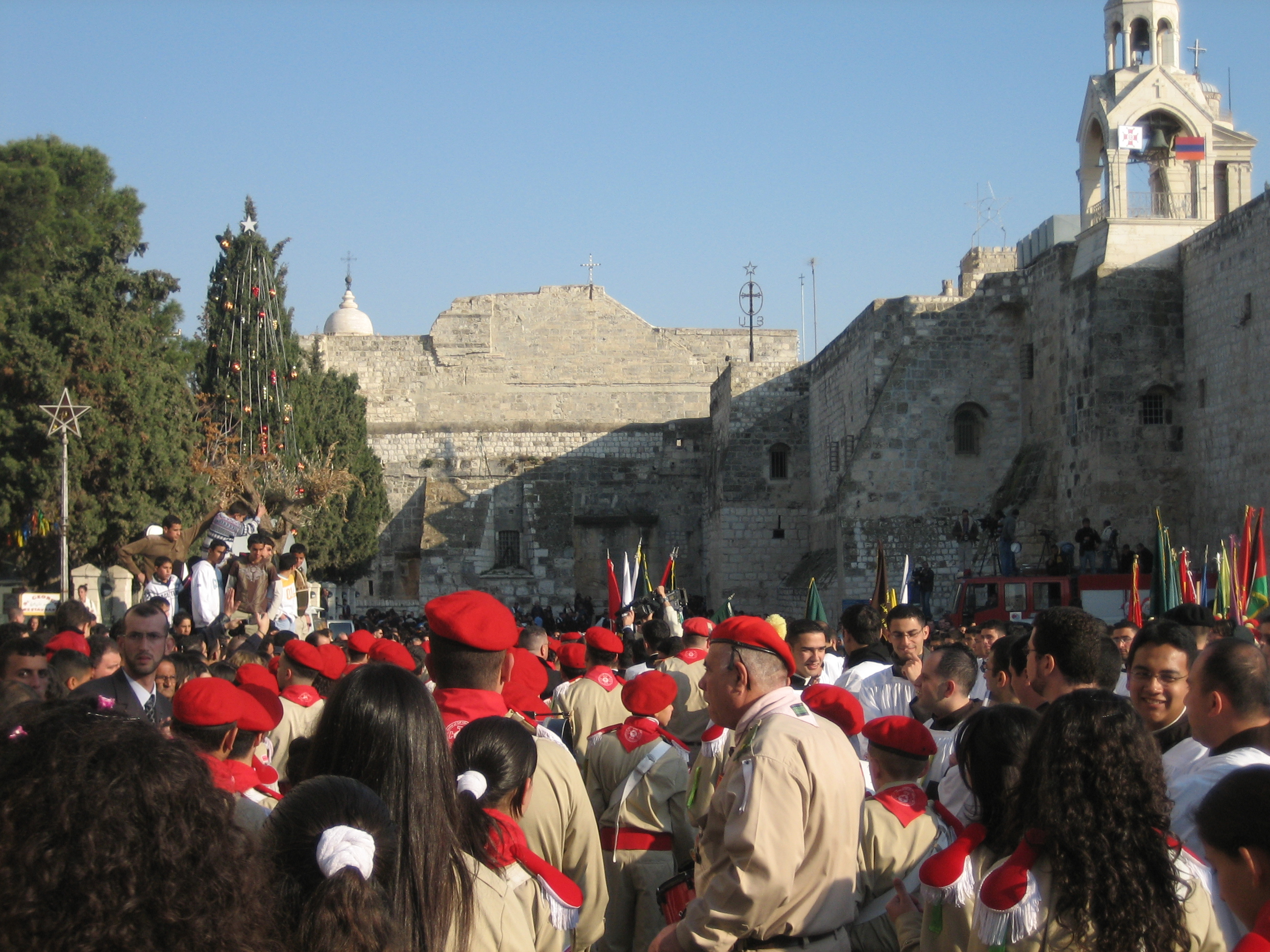
Palestinian Christian scouts on Christmas Eve in front of the Church of the Nativity in Bethlehem (2006).

=== Hospitality toward pilgrims ===
During the later Middle Ages and early modern times, the Custody was official provider of hospitality for Latin pilgrims to the Holy Land, i.e. Westerners be they Catholic or Protestant. Such facilities existed primarily at Jaffa and in Jerusalem.

The Custody runs the Christian Information Centre (C.I.C.), established in 1973, which provides Christian pilgrims of various denominations with relevant information.

=== Education ===
Schools founded by the Franciscan friars include Terra Santa College in Nicosia, Cyprus and Magnificat Institute in Jerusalem.

=== Biblical and archaeological research ===
The Franciscan Archaeological Institute on Mount Nebo in Jordan and the Studium Biblicum Franciscanum in Jerusalem are listed on the homepage of the Custody, without any further details regarding the type of relationship between them (see here).

=== Media centre ===
The Custody has a communications department in charge of the official media in the Holy Land, which is based at the Terra Sancta College in Jerusalem and includes a multimedia centre broadcasting news programmes in different languages, and the editorial office of the Christian Media Center and of the French-language Terre Sainte Magazine.

(La) Terre Sainte/Terra Santa is a magazine first published by the Franciscan Printing Press under the supervision of Custos Diotallevi in 1921 in Italian, French and Spanish and since then in several other languages, such as English as The Holy Land Review since 1975. The Holy Land Review and the content of the TerraSanta.net platform are not officially published by the Custody and do not necessarily express its viewpoint.

=== Printing press ===
The Custody has long strived to own and operate its own printing press, but was only able to do so in 1847. The machinery was installed at Saint Savior's Monastery in Jerusalem and produced that very year a few small-scale school materials in Arabic, and its first proper book, a bilingual Italian-Arabic catechism, these being the first books ever printed in Arabic in Palestine. This "Franciscan print room" later became the Franciscan Printing Press (FPP), which today has its headquarters on the eastern side of the Mount of Olives in Betphage.

In 2005, the FPP has become part of TS Edizioni, where TS stands for Terra Santa. TS Edizioni was established in 2005, is part of the Fondazione Terra Santa, and operates, in Italy, as the publishing centre of the Custody of the Holy Land. It combines the tradition of two Franciscan Holy Land-related institutions, the FPP in Jerusalem, and the Centro propaganda e stampa founded in the 1910s in Milan. TS acts under the patronage of the Custody and co-publishes the institutional collections.

The FPP has enabled the publication in several languages of the research done by the Jerusalem-based Studium Biblicum Franciscanum. Today, the FPP serves the printing needs of the Custody as well as of local publications.

== Regional concerns ==
Fr. Pizzaballa expressed concern that many Christians were leaving the region, especially the Christians of the Palestinian Territories, and that housing assistance was being offered to discourage emigration. He attributed the exodus to lack of prospects for the future and the political situation.

In 2011, the Catholic News Service (CNS) website aired an interview on Vatican Radio in which Father Pizzaballa alluded to the tense situation for Christians in Syria and Egypt.

== List of sanctuaries ==
The order manages 50-55 "sanctuaries" across the region. Most of these churches were built in the 19th and 20th centuries, and a significant number were designed by Antonio Barluzzi.

Location	Sanctuary
Capernaum	St. Peter's Church
Cana	Wedding Church at Cana
Cana	St. Bartholomew the Apostle Church
Hattin	Site of the second multiplication of loaves
Jaffa of Nazareth	Chapel of Saint James the Apostle
Magdala	Site of the birth of Saint Mary Magdalene
Mount Tabor	Church of the Transfiguration
Mount Tabor	Descendentibus Chapel
Mount Tabor	Site of the healing of the demon-possessed man at Daburiyeh
Nein	Church of the Resurrection of the Widow's Son
Nazareth	Basilica of the Annunciation
Nazareth	St. Joseph's Church
Nazareth	Mensa Christi Church
Nazareth	Chapel of the Virgin Mary's Fright
Nazareth	Mount Precipice
Sepphoris	Home of Saints Joachim and Anne
Tabgha	Church of the Primacy of Saint Peter
Tabgha	Church of the Beatitudes
Tiberias	St. Peter's Church
Ein Karem	Church of Saint John the Baptist
Ein Karem	Church of the Visitation
Ein Karem	The Desert of Saint John the Baptist
Bethany	Tomb of Lazarus
Bethany	Church of Saint Lazarus
Bethlehem and Beit Sahour	Church of the Nativity (shared, see Status Quo)
Bethlehem and Beit Sahour	The Manger of Christ
Bethlehem and Beit Sahour	Grotto and Tomb of Saint Jerome
Bethlehem and Beit Sahour	Chapel of the Milk Grotto
Bethlehem and Beit Sahour	Saint Joseph's House
Bethlehem and Beit Sahour	Chapel of the Shepherds' Field
Bethlehem and Beit Sahour	David's Reservoir
Bethphage	Church of Bethphage
Al-Qubeiba	St. Cleophas Church
Jerusalem	Holy Cenacle (Mount Zion)
Jerusalem	Church of the Holy Sepulchre (shared, see Status Quo)
Jerusalem	Church of the Flagellation
Jerusalem	Lithostrotos Chapel (II Station of the Cross)
Jerusalem	Chapel of Simon of Cyrene (V Station of the Cross)
Jerusalem	Column of Sentencing of the VII Station of the Cross
Jerusalem	Church of All Nations
Jerusalem	Gethsemane: Grotto of the Betrayal
Jerusalem	Tomb of the Virgin Mary (shared, see Status Quo)
Jerusalem	Dominus Flevit Church
Jerusalem	Chapel of the Ascension (shared, see Status Quo)
Jerusalem	Tomb of the Prophet Isaiah
Jaffa	St. Peter's Church
Qasr al-Yahud	St. John the Baptist Chapel
Ramla	St. Nicodemus and St. Joseph of Arimathea Church
Damascus	Saint Ananias House
Damascus	Site of the Conversion of Saint Paul
Mount Nebo	Memorial Church of Moses

== List of Custodians ==
13th century

1217 – Elia da Cortona (Note: Leader of the first group of friars sent to Jerusalem after the first General Chapter (1217).)

1. 1219 – Saint Francis of Assisi
2. 1247 – Giacomo (Narciso?)
3. 1266 – Giacomo da Puy
4. ? – Vincentius de Burgundia
5. 1270? – Giovannino da Parma
6. 1286 – Geleberto

14th century

7. 1306 – Guido
8. 1310 – Rogero Guarini
9. 1328 – Nicolò da San Martino
10. 1330 – Giovanni Fedanzola
  1333 – Rogero Guarini (Note: Second term.)
11. 1337 – Giovanni di Stefano
12. 1337 – Giacomo Normanno
13. ? – Nicola di Giovanni
14. 1363 – Bernardino da Padova
15. 1372 – Antonio di Giacomo
16. 1376 – Nicolò da Creta (o Candia)
17. 1382 – Giovanni
18. 1384 – Nicolò da Venezia
19. 1388 – Gerardo Calvetti

15th century

20. 1400 – Nicolò Coronario
21. 1405 – Nicolò di Pietro
22. 1414 – Pascutius Davini de Assisio
23. 1421 – Giacomo di Antonio
24. 1424 – Giovanni Belloro
25. 1430 – Luigi da Bologna
26. 1434 – Giacomo Delfino
27. 1438 – Gandolfo da Sicilia
28. 1446 – Baldassare da Santa Maria
29. 1455 – Antonio da Mugnano
30. 1462 – Gabriele Mezzavacca
31. 1464 – Paolo d'Albenga
32. 1467 – Francesco da Piacenza
33. 1472 – Andrea da Parma
34. 1475 – Giacomo d'Alessandria
35. 1478 – Giovanni de Thomacellis
36. 1481 – Paolo da Canneto
37. 1484 – Bernardino da Parma
  1487 – Francesco da Perugia (Note: He died before his arrival to the Custody.)
38. 1487 – Bernardino Caimo
39. 1489 – Bartolomeo da Piacenza
40. 1493 – Francesco Suriano
41. 1495 – Angelo da Foligno
  1496 – Bartolomeo da Piacenza
42. 1499 – Antonio Gozze de Regnis

16th century

43. 1501 – Mauro da San Bernardino
44. 1504 – Luigi da Napoli
45. 1507 – Bernardino del Vecchio
  1512 – Francesco Suriano
46. 1514 – Nicolò da Tossignano
47. 1517 – Zenobio da Firenze
48. 1518 – Gabriele ?
49. 1519 – Angelo da Ferrara
50. 1528 – Giovanni
51. 1532 – Mario da Messina
52. 1532 – Battista da Macerata
53. 1535 – Tomaso da Norcia
54. 1541 – Dionisio da Sarcognano
55. 1545 – Felice da Venezia
56. 1544 – Giorgio Bosnese
  1545 – Felice da Venezia
57. 1547 – Bonaventura Corsetti
58. 1551 – Bonifacio Stefani
59. 1559 – Antonio da Bergamo
60. 1560 – Aurelio da Griano
  1564 – Bonifacio Stefani
61. 1565 – Bernardino da Collestate
62. 1566 – Girolamo da Fossato
63. 1568 – Angelo da Portomaurizio
64. 1568 – Gian Francesco d'Arsignano Vicent
65. 1571 – Antonio da Sant'Angelo
66. 1572 – Geremia da Brescia
67. 1580 – Giovanni da Bergamo
68. 1581 – Angelo Stella
69. 1584 – Paolino Olivoli
70. 1585 – Accursio da Quinzano
71. 1588 – Gian Battista da Montegiano
72. 1590 – Francesco da Spello
73. 1593 – Felice Ranieri da Fratta
74. 1593 – Gian Francesco da Salandra
75. 1597 – Evangelista da Gabiano

17th century

76. 1600 – Francesco Manerba
77. 1603 – Cesario da Trino
78. 1608 – Gaudenzio Saibanti
79. 1612 – Angelo da Messina
80. 1616 – Basilio Basili
81. 1619 – Francesco Dulcedo
82. 1620 – Tommaso Obicini
83. 1621 – Ambrogio Pantoliano
84. 1622 – Francesco Spinelli
85. 1625 – Sante da Messina
86. 1628 – Diego Campanile
87. 1632 – Paolo da Lodi
88. 1634 – Francesco da Cattaro
89. 1637 – Andrea d'Arco
90. 1642 – Pietro Verniero
91. 1645 – Francesco Merisi
92. 1648 – Antonio da Gaeta
  1651 – Ambrogio Pantoliano
93. 1652 – Mariano Morone
94. 1659 – Eusebio Valles
95. 1664 – Francesco M. Rhini
96. 1669 – Teofilo Testa
97. 1673 – Claudio Gavazzi
98. 1675 – Tomaso da Caltagirone
99. 1675 – Giovanni Bonsignori
100. 1678 – Pier Marino Sormani
101. 1683 – Pier Antonio Grassi
102. 1686 – Angelico da Milano
103. 1689 – Gregorio da Parghelia
104. 1691 – Gian Battista D'Atina
105. 1695 – Baldassare Caldera
106. 1697 – Francesco da Santo Floro

18th century

107. 1701 – Bonaventura da Majori
108. 1704 – Benedetto da Bari
109. 1705 – Costantino Ultorchi
110. 1706 – Gaetano Potestà
111. 1710 – Lorenzo Cozza
112. 1716 – Giuseppe Maria da Perugia
113. 1720 – Gian Filippo da Milano
114. 1722 – Giacomo da Lucca
115. 1730 – Andrea da Montoro
116. 1735 – Angelico da Gazolo
117. 1740 – Paolo da Laurino
  1743 – Giacomo da Lucca
118. 1744 – Desiderio da Casabasciana
119. 1751 – Prospero Zinelli
120. 1754 – Pio da Mentone
121. 1756 – Domenico da Venezia
122. 1762 – Paolo da Piacenza
123. 1767 – Luigi da Bastia
124. 1773 – Valeriano Bellandi
125. 1773 – Gian Domenico da Levigliano
126. 1795 – Placido da Roma
127. 1798 – Ladislao da Viterbo

19th century

128. 1801 – Zenobio Puccini
129. 1805 – Bonaventura da Nola
130. 1808 – Giuseppe M. Pierallini
131. 1815 – Girolamo da Osimo
132. 1817 – Salvatore Antonio da Malta
133. 1820 – Ugolino Cesarini
134. 1822 – Gian Antonio da Rogliano
135. 1825 – Tomaso da Montasola
136. 1831 – Francesco di S. Lorenzo alle Grotte
137. 1835 – Francesco Saverio da Malta
138. 1838 – Perpetuo Guasco
139. 1841 – Cherubino Maria da Cori
140. 1843 – Cherubino da Civezza
141. 1847 – Bernardino Trionfetti
142. 1857 – Bonaventura Robotti
143. 1863 – Serafino Milani
144. 1874 – Gaudenzio Bonfigli
145. 1880 – Guido Corbelli
146. 1886 – Aurelio Briante
147. 1888 – Giacomo Ghezzi
  1894 – Aurelio Briante

20th century

148. 1900 – Frediano Giannini
149. 1906 – Roberto Razzoli
150. 1914 – Onorato Carcaterra
151. 1915 – Serafino Cimino
152. 1918 – Ferdinando Diotallevi; as Custos he was also member of the Pro-Jerusalem Society's leading Council
153. 1925 – Aurelio Marotta
154. 1931 – Nazzareno Jacopozzi
155. 1937 – Alberto Gori
156. 1950 – Giacinto Maria Faccio
157. 1955 – Angelico Lazzeri
158. 1957 – Alfredo Polidori
159. 1962 – Vincenzo Cappiello
160. 1968 – Alfonso Calabrese
161. 1969 – Erminio Roncari
162. 1974 – Maurilio Sacchi
163. 1980 – Ignazio Mancini
164. 1986 – Carlo Cecchitelli
165. 1992 – Giuseppe Nazzaro
166. 1998 – Giovanni Battistelli

21st century

167. 2004 – Pierbattista Pizzaballa
168. 2016 – Francesco Patton
169. 2025 – Francesco Ielpo

== See also ==
- Latin Patriarchate of Jerusalem
- Catholic Church in Palestine
- Catholic Church in Israel
- Palestinian Christians
- Holy See–Israel relations
- Order of the Holy Sepulchre
- Brotherhood of the Holy Sepulchre
- ATS Association of the Holy Land
