= ATS Association of the Holy Land =

Association of the Holy Land
- Associazione di Terra Santa (ATS)
- Formation: 2002

The Holy Land Association (Italian: Associazione di Terra Santa, or ATS) is the non-governmental charitable organisation of the Custody of the Holy Land. In this regard, the President of the association is entitled to the Custody of the Holy Land.

The association was formed in 2002 to provide an enclosure for the realization of projects for the protection of the places of Holy Land and the resident population in all countries of the Custody of the Holy Land: Israel, the Palestinian territories, Cyprus, Egypt, Syria, Jordan, Lebanon, and Rhodes (Greece) .

In 2002, in agreement with the Jordanian authorities for Madama and Umm Al Rasas, the Faculty of Architecture of the University of Florence (in Florence), Jordanian Department of Antiquities, the ATS has carried out the restoration and a museum of the Memorial of Moses on Mount Nebo. In addition, the ATS in 2002, with the support of UNESCO, the Italian Ministry of Foreign Affairs, (Florence, Rome La Sapienza) and abroad (Copenhagen) has launched an intensive information campaign on the terms of the socio-economic deprivation and cultural heritage of the Middle East.

In 2006, under the direction of Father Michele Piccirillo, and with the support of the Regione Lazio, has been completed the restoration of the carpet floor of the Church of Saint George in Jericho, dating back to 536 A.D.

Following the war between Israel and Lebanon, between July and August 2006, ATS and the Regione Lombardia have carried out a program of intervention for the protection of affected populations.

== See also ==
- Order of the Holy Sepulchre
