= Mensa Christi Church =

Catholic church in Nazareth, Israel

Coordinates: 32°42′15.65″N 35°17′42.76″E

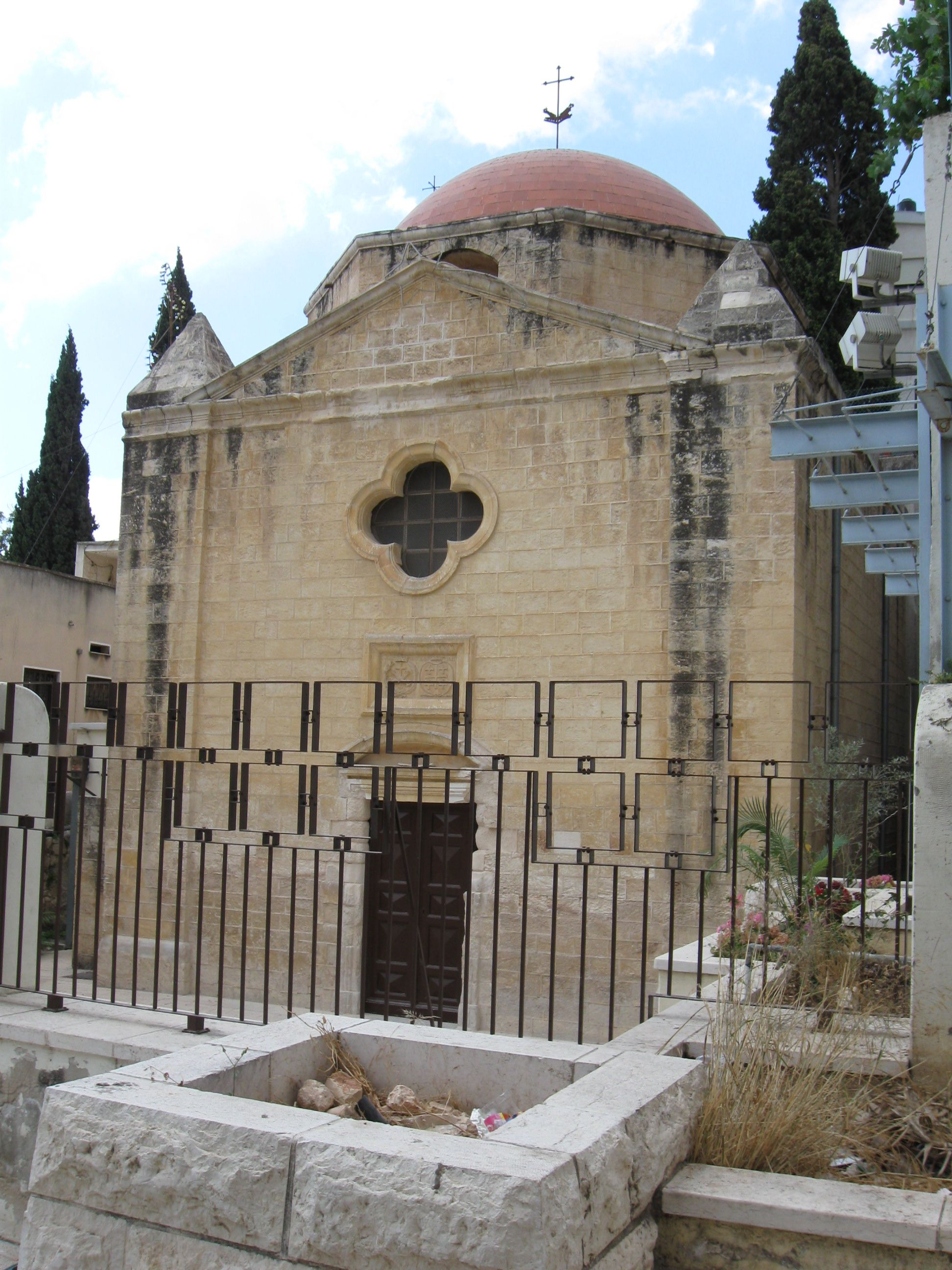
- Church exterior

Religion
- Affiliation: Roman Catholic
- Leadership: Franciscan Order

Location
- Location: Nazareth, Israel
- Interactive map of Mensa Christi Church

Architecture
- Completed: 1861

Mensa Christi is a Roman Catholic church located in Nazareth, northern Israel.

== Christian tradition ==
Mensa Christi (Latin for "table of Christ") contains a large rectangular block of limestone (3.6 x 2.7 x 9 m)) that, according to a pious legend, served as a table when Jesus had a meal with his disciples in his hometown. When a biblical reference needs to be applied, the quoted passage is from the Gospel of Mark (Mark 16:14), where Jesus appears to the eleven remaining apostles after his resurrection and finds them reclining at the table and eating, and he scolds them for not believing those who had witnessed him having returned from the dead.

The three decades Jesus spent in Nazareth are commonly called "the silent years", with the Gospels telling us close to nothing about that long period in his life. Over the centuries, Christians have marked the sites commemorating events from Jesus' life in his home village.

== History ==
In 1781 the Custody of the Holy Land bought the ruined church from the Muslims. The Franciscans initially built a chapel at this site in the latter half of the 18th century.

The current church, a renovation of the earlier chapel, was completed in 1861.

The Israeli government, in a joint project with the local municipality, recently completed an $80 million renovation and restoration of the old city of Nazareth as part of the Millennium celebrations of the year 2000. A part of this project was the restoration of the church's frescoes and dome.

== Location ==
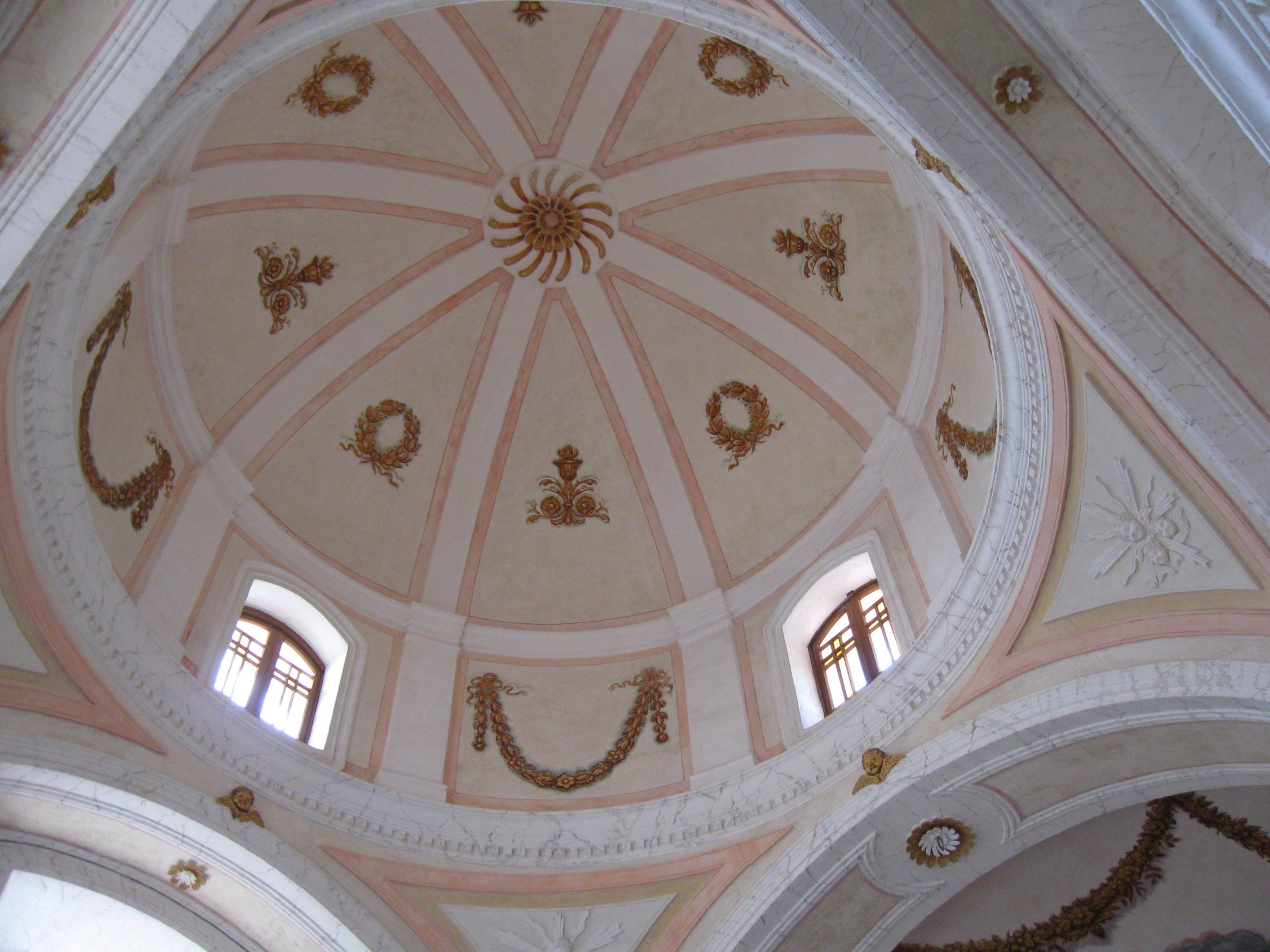
Inside the church

The church is located within a dense neighborhood, above the church district, in the Old City of Nazareth. It is north of the Sisters of Saint Charles Borromeo Convent, and near the Maronite Church of the Annunciation and Ecumenical Christian Child Care Center. It can be accessed only by foot down a steep road from the Carmelite convent, or above the Synagogue Church. This type of walkway is typical of small alleys in Nazareth and other Arab villages in Israel. The church is locked most of the time, but can be visited upon request.

== Another "Mensa Christi" ==
A very similar significance is attached to the Church of the Primacy of St. Peter in Tabgha, on the northwest shore of the Sea of Galilee, where the altar is built upon a cliff known in Latin as Mensa Christi, the Table of Christ, where the resurrected Jesus prepared bread and fishes over a fire for his disciples. This church also commemorates Jesus' reinstatement of Peter as chief apostle.
