= Pierbattista Pizzaballa =

Latin Patriarch of Jerusalem (born 1965)

His Beatitude and Eminence Pierbattista Pizzaballa OFM
- Cardinal, Latin Patriarch of Jerusalem
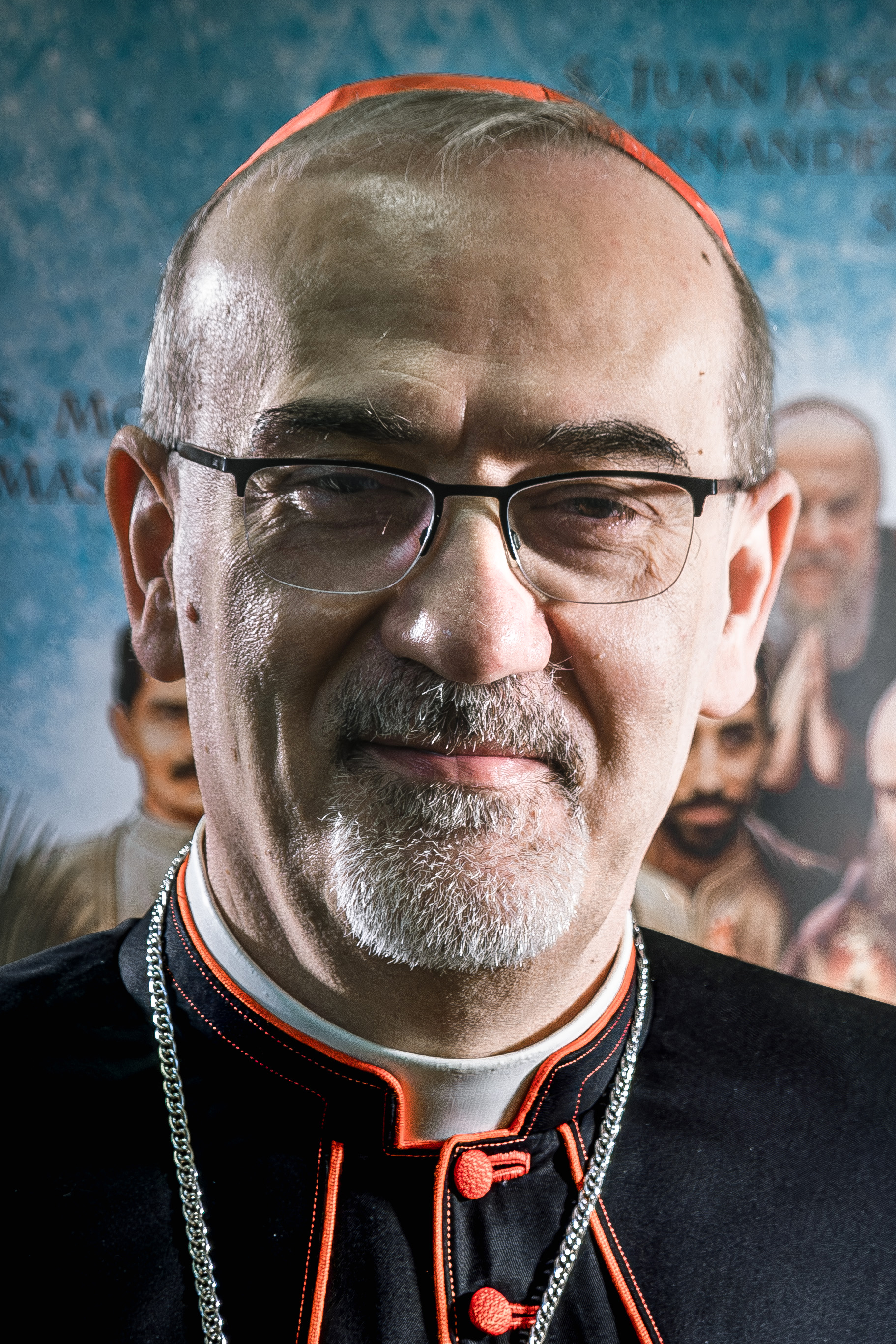
- Pizzaballa in 2024
- Church: Catholic Church
- See: Jerusalem
- Appointed: 24 October 2020
- Installed: 6 November 2020
- Predecessor: Fouad Twal
- Other posts: President of Caritas Jerusalem; Grand Prior of the Equestrian Order of the Holy Sepulchre of Jerusalem (2020‍–‍ ); Cardinal-Priest of Sant'Onofrio (2023‍–‍ ); Bailiff Knight Grand Cross of Honour and Devotion of the Sovereign Military Order of Malta (2024‍–‍ ); Member of the Dicastery for Institutes of Consecrated Life and Societies of Apostolic Life of the Roman Curia (2025‍–‍ ); Member of the Dicastery for Interreligious Dialogue of the Roman Curia (2025‍–‍ )
- Previous posts: Custos of the Holy Land (2004‍–‍2016); Titular Archbishop of Verbe (2016‍–‍2020); Apostolic Administrator of the Latin Patriarchate of Jerusalem (2016‍–‍2020)

Orders
- Ordination: 15 September 1990 by Giacomo Biffi
- Consecration: 10 September 2016 by Leonardo Sandri
- Created cardinal: 30 September 2023 by Pope Francis
- Rank: Cardinal priest

Personal details
- Born: 21 April 1965 (age 61) Cologno al Serio, Italy
- Motto: Sufficit tibi gratia mea (Latin for 'My grace is sufficient for you')

- Coat of arms

Pierbattista Pizzaballa (Note: Italian: [ˌpjɛrbatˈtista pittsaˈballa]; Latin: Petrus Baptista Pizzaballa.) OFM (born 21 April 1965) is an Italian member of the Franciscan Order and a Catholic cardinal who has been serving as the Latin Patriarch of Jerusalem since 6 November 2020.

After being received into the Franciscan Order in 1984, he spent his novitiate at the Franciscan Shrine of La Verna in Arezzo, Italy. In 1990, after having obtained a diploma in classical studies from the Archiepiscopal Seminary of Ferrara as well as a bachelor's degree in theology from the Pontifical University Antonianum and having been ordained a priest, he was called to service in the Holy Land. In Jerusalem, he went on to study biblical theology first at the Studium Biblicum Franciscanum and then from 1995 to 1999 at the Hebrew University of Jerusalem. He obtained a PhD degree from the Hebrew University of Jerusalem and became an assistant professor of Biblical Hebrew and Judaism at the Franciscan Faculty of Biblical and Archaeological Sciences in Jerusalem as well as the Studium Theologicum Jerosolymitanum.

At the same time, in 1999, Pizzaballa joined the Franciscans working at the Custody of the Holy Land founded in 1217 by Saint Francis of Assisi. In 1342, the Franciscans were officially declared by two papal bulls as the Catholic Church's custodians of the Christian Holy Places. In 2004, he was elected to the position of Custos of the Holy Land, the head of the Custody and all Franciscans in Israel, the Palestinian territories, Lebanon, Jordan, Syria, Iraq and parts of Egypt. The title of Custos (guardian) likewise goes back to St. Francis. Pizzaballa was reelected twice as Custos and served in this position for twelve years until 2016.

In 2016, he was ordained a bishop in Italy and appointed as the Apostolic Administrator of the Latin Patriarchate in Jerusalem. In 2020, he became the Latin Patriarch in Jerusalem, the head of Christianity's mother church including the areas of Israel, the Palestinian territories, Jordan and Cyprus. Three years later, in 2023, he was made a cardinal by Pope Francis. Following Francis' death, he was considered papabile (a possible candidate to be elected pope by the College of Cardinals) at the 2025 papal conclave despite his relatively young age.

== Early life and education ==
Pierbattista Pizzaballa was born in Cologno al Serio, Bergamo, Italy, son of Pietro Pizzaballa and Maria Maddalena Tadini. He has two brothers and is the nephew of Pierluigi Pizzaballa, a former professional Italian football player (goalkeeper).

Growing up in the small hamlet of Castel Liteggio, Pizzaballa witnessed a "simple and authentic" lifestyle which he describes with the following words: "It was a simple and genuine world, and a sober and happy life." Motivated by a desire to be like a much-loved local priest, Don Pèrsec, Pizzaballa felt a vocation to be a priest already as a child at the age of nine. In September 1976, he entered the Franciscan Le Grazie minor seminary in Rimini at the age of 11 and eight years later, in September 1984, the Franciscan novitiate in La Verna. He made his first vows there on 7 September 1985, and his perpetual vows in Bologna on 4 October 1989. He was ordained a priest on 15 September 1990, in the Cathedral of Bologna by Cardinal Giacomo Biffi.

Pizzaballa obtained his diploma in classical studies at the Archiepiscopal Seminary of Ferrara and went on to earn his bachelor's degree in theology at the Pontifical University Antonianum. As a 25-year-old priest he was sent to the Holy Land where he studied biblical theology at the Studium Biblicum Franciscanum in Jerusalem and learned biblical as well as modern Hebrew. Besides his native Italian, Pizzaballa today speaks Hebrew, Latin, English, and Arabic.

He was then sent to the Hebrew University of Jerusalem from 1995 to 1999 to deepen his understanding of Jewish religious thought where he was the only Christian studying Scripture at that time but said it was "very interesting" because it was the first time that he found himself in a "non-Christian context." In 1998, he became assistant professor of Biblical Hebrew and Judaism at the Franciscan Faculty of Biblical and Archaeological Sciences in Jerusalem and the Studium Theologicum Jerosolymitanum. He was responsible for the translation of the Roman Missal into Hebrew and its publication in 1995. He also translated liturgical texts into Hebrew.

== Custody of the Holy Land ==
In July 1999, Pizzaballa joined the Franciscans working at the Custody of the Holy Land which was founded by Saint Francis of Assissi. He was first entrusted with the pastoral care of Hebrew-speaking Catholics and on 9 May 2001, appointed Superior of the Convent of Saints Simeon and Anna in Jerusalem. In May 2004, he was elected to the position of Custos of the Holy Land, the head of the Franciscan priory known as the Custody of the Holy Land and of all Franciscans in the Middle East (Israel, Palestinian territories, Lebanon, Jordan, Syria, Iraq and parts of Egypt). Having been elected to a six-year term in May 2004, re-elected to a three-year term in March 2010, and reconfirmed for another three-year term in 2013, he served in this position for twelve years until 2016.

From 2005 to 2008, while Custos, he also served as Patriarchal Vicar and in 2008 was appointed a Consultor in the Commission for Relations with Judaism of the Pontifical Council for Promoting Christian Unity.

In June 2014, Pizzaballa organized the peace prayer in the Vatican gardens, which brought together Pope Francis, then Israeli President Shimon Peres and Palestinian leader Mahmoud Abbas. Pizzaballa criticized Israel's construction of a barrier between the West Bank and Jerusalem and participated in protests against it in 2015. He also, before becoming a bishop, criticized Palestinian leaders for blaming all problems on the Israeli occupation of Gaza and the West Bank.

== Titular Archbishop of Verbe ==
On 24 June 2016, Pope Francis nominated Pizzaballa as Apostolic Administrator sede vacante of the Latin Patriarchate of Jerusalem and appointed him titular archbishop of Verbe. On 10 September 2016 he was consecrated by Cardinal Leonardo Sandri in the Bergamo Cathedral, with Bishop Francesco Beschi, Archbishop Fouad Twal, the then new Custos of the Holy Land Francesco Patton and Bishop Nektarios from the Greek Orthodox Church also present. His unusually long interim tenure reflected the internal tensions between the traditional Arab-centered Patriarchate and supporters of the expansion of its pastoral care towards Israeli society. The appointment of an Italian broke with tradition, as such posts are normally assigned to members of the ethnic group they predominantly serve, such as his immediate predecessors (a Palestinian and Jordanian respectively).

In 2016, Pizzaballa joined the Equestrian Order of the Holy Sepulchre of Jerusalem and became its Pro Grand Prior, and then Grand Prior upon his appointment as Latin Patriarch. On 31 May 2017 he was appointed a member of the Congregation for the Oriental Churches.

== Latin Patriarch of Jerusalem ==
On 24 October 2020, Pizzaballa was appointed Latin Patriarch of Jerusalem by Pope Francis. He leads the board of directors of Caritas Jerusalem.

On 9 July 2023, Pope Francis announced he planned to create him a cardinal at a consistory scheduled for 30 September 2023. At that consistory, he was made Cardinal-Priest of Sant'Onofrio, the official church of the Order of the Holy Sepulchre.

After the death of Pope Francis, he was considered papabile, (possible candidate to be made pope) at the 2025 conclave. Analysts believe his international expertise and tendency to stay away from divisive doctrinal issues may have aided his chances, but his relatively young age could have made him being chosen as pope unlikely. Cardinal Robert Prevost was eventually chosen as pope, taking the name Leo XIV.

In June and July 2025, Pope Leo XIV appointed Cardinal Pizzaballa, in addition to his role as Latin Patriarch, as a member of the Roman Curia, the Vatican's governing body. Pizzaballa was selected as a cardinal member of two dicasteries (ministries): the Dicastery for Institutes of Consecrated Life and Societies of Apostolic Life which is responsible for all Catholic religious and lay orders, societies, congregations as well as institutes and the Dicastery for Interreligious Dialogue.

On 29 March 2026, Pizzaballa was blocked by Israeli police for "security reasons" as part of Israel's ban on gatherings of more than 50 people while he was preparing to celebrate Palm Sunday Mass at the Church of the Holy Sepulchre. The Latin Patriarchate of Jerusalem released a statement declaring that "this incident is a grave precedent" and "constitutes a manifestly unreasonable and grossly disproportionate measure". Prime Minister Benjamin Netanyahu told the relevant authorities later that day that Pizzaballa "be granted full and immediate access" to the church.

== Positions ==
In the leadup to the 2025 papal conclave, it was described that Pizzaballa had not stated clear positions on many contentious issues within the Catholic Church. According to Crux, a newspaper focusing on the Catholic Church, Pizzaballa's stances on things like "the blessing of people in same-sex unions or the ordination of women deacons [are] something of a mystery."

=== Arab–Israel conflict ===
Pizzaballa condemned the October 7 attacks by Hamas as "barbaric" and "horrific". He described the "barbarism of Hamas" as "unacceptable and incomprehensible", saying that it had brought back "a state of war" which in its quality surpassed what had been seen in the Holy Land in recent times. He offered himself as a hostage in exchange for Israeli children kidnapped on 7 October and held hostage in Gaza.

At the same time, he advocated for an immediate end to the Gaza war in its early days and for an end to the occupation of Palestinian territories. In late October 2023, he wrote that "[m]y conscience and moral duty require me" to condemn the "atrocity" that was committed on 7 October. He continued that the "same conscience, however, with a great burden on my heart, leads me to state with equal clarity" that "this new cycle of violence" brought to Gaza had led to immense suffering, including for children and women. He continued: "These are tragedies that cannot be understood and which we have a duty to denounce and condemn unreservedly. The continuous heavy bombardment that has been pounding Gaza for days will only cause more death and destruction [...] It is time to stop this war, this senseless violence." Pizzaballa further stated that the military campaign in Gaza won't solve the conflict. He was a signatory to the 2023 "Statement on the Escalating Humanitarian Crisis in Gaza" which condemned attacks on civilians, called for de-escalation and for humanitarian aid to enter Gaza. On his visit to Bethlehem on Christmas Eve 2023, Pizzaballa donned a Palestinian keffiyeh and expressed a renewed desire for peace in the region. He cosigned the Christmas message released by the Patriarchs and Heads of Churches in Jerusalem advocating Christians to refrain from public celebration of the holiday in solidarity with those affected by the war.

In July 2024, speaking to a delegation from Aid to the Church in Need, the Patriarch summed up the difficulty of leading both Arab and Hebrew Catholics, saying: "The situation is so polarised that if you are close to the Palestinians, the Israelis feel betrayed, and vice versa. When I speak of the suffering of Gaza, the Hebrew Catholics tell me about the areas which suffered in the 7 October attacks, and on the other side, the Palestinians think only of Gaza. Everybody wants to have a monopoly on the suffering".

In February 2025, the Patriarch commented on the situation in the West Bank, saying that at the time a temporary ceasefire in Gaza started, military and police operations had increased in the West Bank. In July of the same year, he and the Orthodox Patriarch of Jerusalem led a delegation of Christian leaders and diplomats in a solidarity visit to Taybeh, a fully Christian town in the West Bank which had seen attacks by Israeli settlers. During this visit, Cardinal Pizzaballa stated that in the West Bank, currently, the only law was that of power and not that of rights, continuing that "we must work for the law to return to this part of the country, so anyone can appeal to the law to enforce their rights."

After three people were killed when an Israeli strike hit parts of the roof of the Holy Family Church in Gaza, the compound of which shelters hundreds of displaced civilians (both Christians and Muslims) and includes a home for dozens of disabled children cared for by nuns from the order of Mother Teresa, Cardinal Pizzaballa, along with the Orthodox Patriarch Theophilos III of Jerusalem, was granted access into the war zone in Gaza. Pizzaballa went on to stay in the church compound from 18 to 20 July 2025, also visiting the nearby Christian-run Al-Ahli hospital where he met doctors, nurses and patients, a Caritas medicine distribution center as well as the wider neighborhood. He further coordinated the delivery of 500 tons of aid (consisting of food, medical and sanitary supplies) into Gaza which were only authorized for entry after the church incident. Speaking on the Gaza Strip famine amid the war, Cardinal Pizzaballa said he had witnessed extreme hunger in the Strip, and described the then prevailing Israeli blocks on food and medical shipments as a "sentence" for starving Palestinians. He called the policy "unacceptable and morally unjustifiable". At the same time, Pizzaballa said that it was also important "to acknowledge the solidarity [with people in Gaza] of many parts of the Israeli society" and that it was "also thanks to them we could do what we are doing, the [eventual] delivery [of aid], everything".

=== Persecution of Christians ===
In 2014, Pizzaballa, then head of all Franciscans in the Middle East, said that "what was done to the Christians and Yezidis and others" in Iraq and Syria was "shameful". He denounced ISIS (Daesh) as an "abomination" that "has to be stopped" and called upon "all religious communities to raise their voices".

=== Interfaith dialogue ===
Pizzaballa is supportive of interfaith dialogue, noting that efforts such as Pope Francis' 2020 encyclical Fratelli tutti have an "enormous impact" on Arab public consciousness even if they are not widely read. Pizzaballa has also made a concerted effort to show solidarity with the Orthodox community in Israel.

=== Traditional Latin Mass ===
Pizzaballa has expressed some support for the Traditional Latin Mass, the liturgy that was largely replaced by the Mass of Paul VI, but still remains popular among some in Catholicism.

=== Other ===
During his tenure as head of the Assembly of Catholic Ordinaries of the Holy Land, the organization put out a statement denouncing the "mockery of the mystery of the mysteries in Christianity" during the 2024 Summer Olympics opening ceremony.

== Honors and recognition ==
- Holy See: Grand Prior and Knight of the Collar of the Order of the Holy Sepulchre
- Sovereign Military Order of Malta: Bailiff Grand Cross of Honour and Devotion
- Italy: Grand Officer of the Order of the Star of Italy
- Supreme Taxiarch of the Greek Orthodox Equestrian Order of the Holy Sepulchre

== See also ==
- Cardinals created by Francis

== Notes ==
Catholic Church titles
Preceded by Giovanni Battistelli	Custode of the Holy Land; 2004–2016	Succeeded by Francesco Patton
Preceded by Teodoro Mendes Tavares as Bishop of Verbe	— TITULAR — Archbishop of Verbe; 2016–2020	Succeeded by Rafic Nahra as Bishop of Verbe
Vacant Title last held by Fouad Twal	Latin Patriarch of Jerusalem; 2020–	Incumbent
