= Lorenzo Cozza =

Italian friar Minor Observantist, Roman Catholic Cardinal and theologian

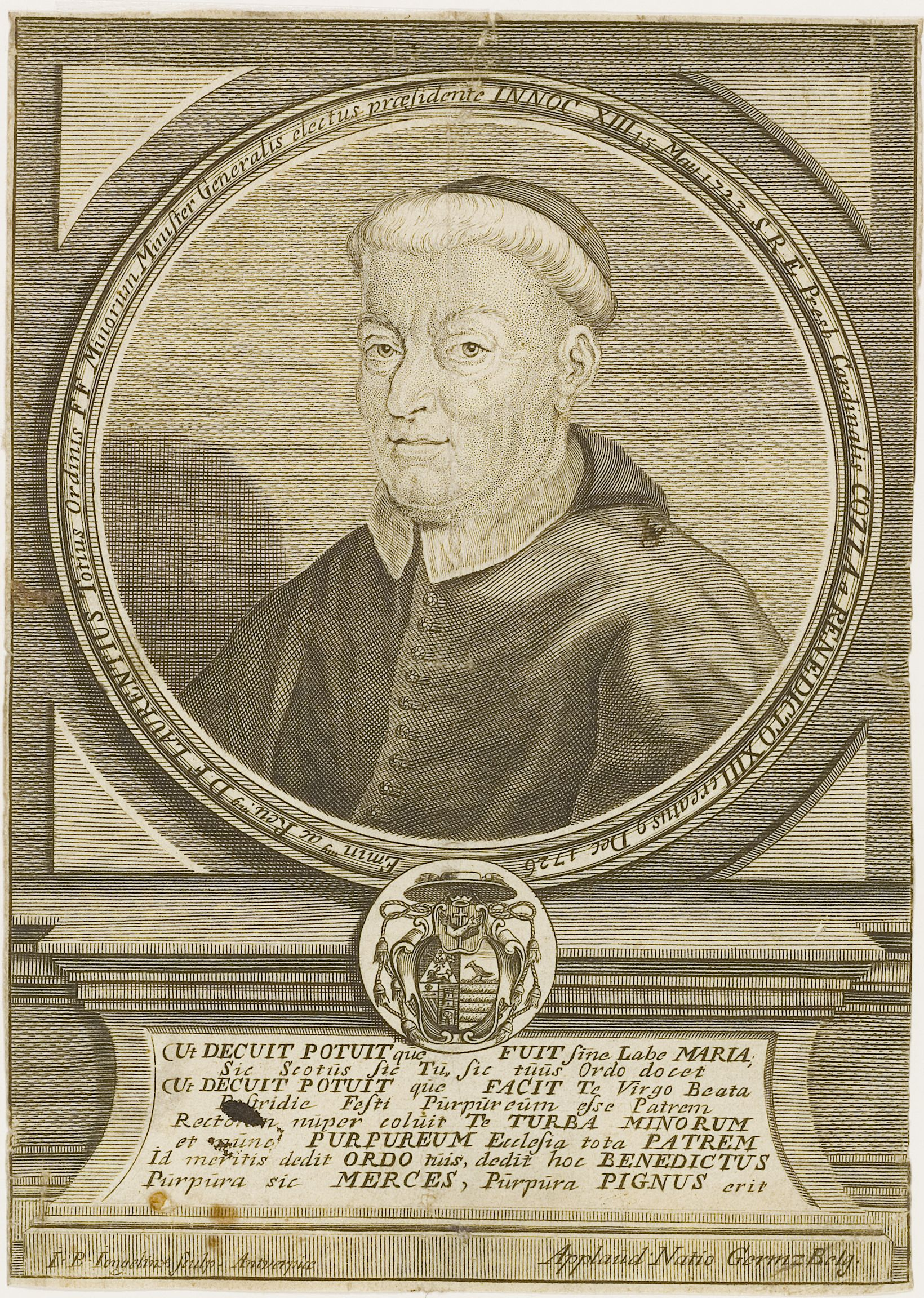
Cardinal Cozza

Lorenzo Cozza (31 March 1654 – 19 January 1729) was an Italian Roman Catholic Cardinal and theologian.

== Biography ==
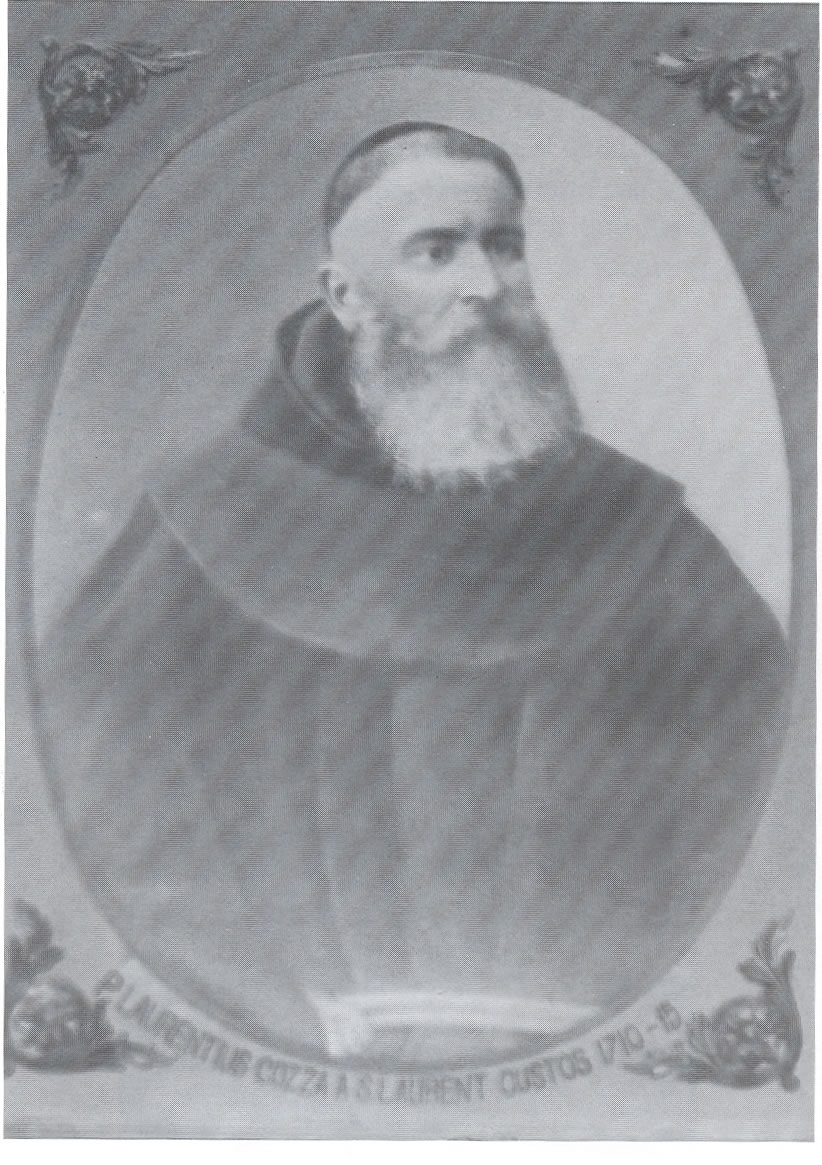
Cardinal Lorenzo Cozza

Lorenzo Cozza was born in San Lorenzo alle Grotte in 1654. In 1669 he entered the Order of the Friars Minor Observantists, in the convent of Holy Trinity at Orvieto, taking the name in religion Francis Lawrence of Saint Lawrence (in Italian, Francesco Lorenzo di San Lorenzo). He studied philosophy and theology in the Franciscan convents in Naples, Viterbo and Rome. No information is available on when he was ordained priest.

In his order, he filled the positions of lector of theology in the convent of Santa Maria in Aracoeli, lector of philosophy in the convent of Saint Diego (Naples, 1676), and lector of theology in the convent of Viterbo, where he also became guardian. He then returned to the convent of Aracoeli as lector of theology and, later, in 1696, guardian. For five years, Cozza was master of Francesco Antonio Placidi, friar Minor and future Saint Thomas of Cori. Cardinal Urbano Sacchetti chose Cozza as his confessor and theological adviser, thus giving rise to a lifelong friendship.

Cozza was later appointed definitor of the Roman province of his order and charged by the minister general (general superior) with the visitation of the convents of Bosnia, Dalmatia and Lombardy. In the pontificate of Clement XI, he was consultor of the Sacred Congregation of the Index and qualificator of the Supreme Sacred Congregation of the Roman and Universal Inquisition. In 1704 he became superior of the Roman province of his order.

While in the Orient (1709–1715), where he had been sent as superior of the Franciscan monastery in Jerusalem and guardian of the Holy Sepulchre, Cozza found leisure to compose several important works. As papal legate he reconciled the Maronites and the Patriarch Jacobus Petrus of Antioch and his faithful, who had long been at disagreement with the Holy See. He was instrumental in the reconciliation and union to Rome of Patriarch Michele Capisoli of Alexandria in 1713. In 1715, he became vice-commissary general of his order by apostolic brief of pope Clement XI.

In 1715, he returned to Rome. In 1723, he was elected minister general of his order. He assisted pope Innocent XIII at his death in 1724. In the consistory of 9 December 1726, he was created Cardinal priest by Benedict XIII, receiving the red hat and the title of Saint Lawrence's at Panisperna (a minor basilica in Rome) on 16 December 1726. On 9 December 1726, he was granted permission to continue as minister general of his order, he opted for the title of Saint Mary in Aracoeli on 20 January 1727.

The remaining years of his life were passed in quiet and study in the little convent of Saint Bartholomew on the Tiber Island, in the southern bend of the Tiber river in Rome, where he died on 19 January 1729, at 1:30 a.m. He was exposed in the convent's church, where the capella papalis took place the following day, and buried in that same church.

== Works ==
His writings include

- Commentarii historico-dogmatici (Rome, 1707)
- Historia polemica de Græcorum schismate (Rome, 1719–1720)
- Terra Sancta vindicata a calumniis ("the Holy Land defended against slander"), left unpublished
