= Francesco Patton =

Italian friar (born 1963)

The Right Reverend Francesco Patton O.F.M.
- Custos Emeritus of the Holy Land
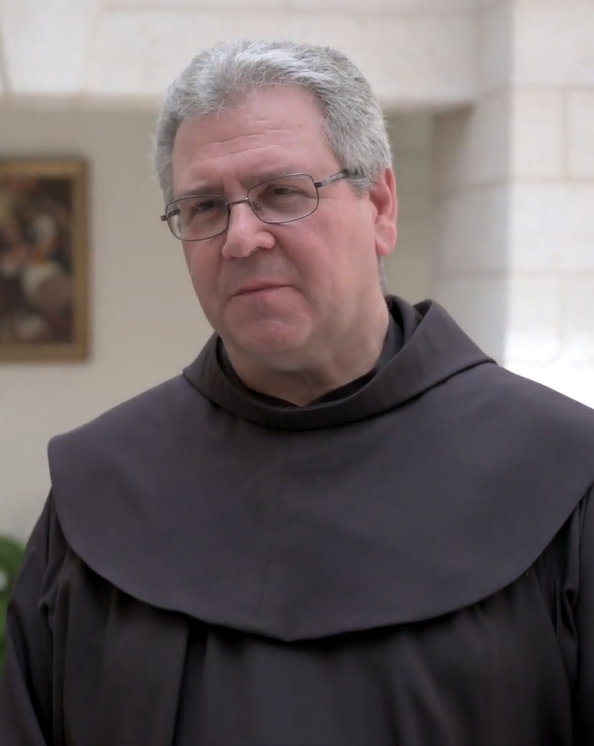
- Francesco Patton in 2022
- Church: Catholic Church
- Appointed: 20 May 2016
- Term ended: 24 June 2025
- Predecessor: Pierbattista Pizzaballa
- Successor: Francesco Lelpo

Orders
- Ordination: 26 May 1989

Personal details
- Born: 23 December 1963 Trento, Italy
- Education: Pontifical Salesian University

Francesco Patton (born 23 December 1963) is an Italian friar who was the 168th Custodian of the Holy Land, an office to which he acceded on 20 May 2016 and has been renewed triennially since. On 24 June 2025, he was succeeded by Francesco Ielpo.

Patton was born in Trento, Italy and earned a Licentiate from the Pontifical Salesian University. He was ordained in 1989.

== See also ==
- Franciscans
- Latin Patriarchate of Jerusalem
