= Monastery of Saint Saviour =

Catholic Franciscan monastery in Jerusalem

Monastery of Saint Saviour, or Abbey Church of St John the Evangelist (or Theologian)
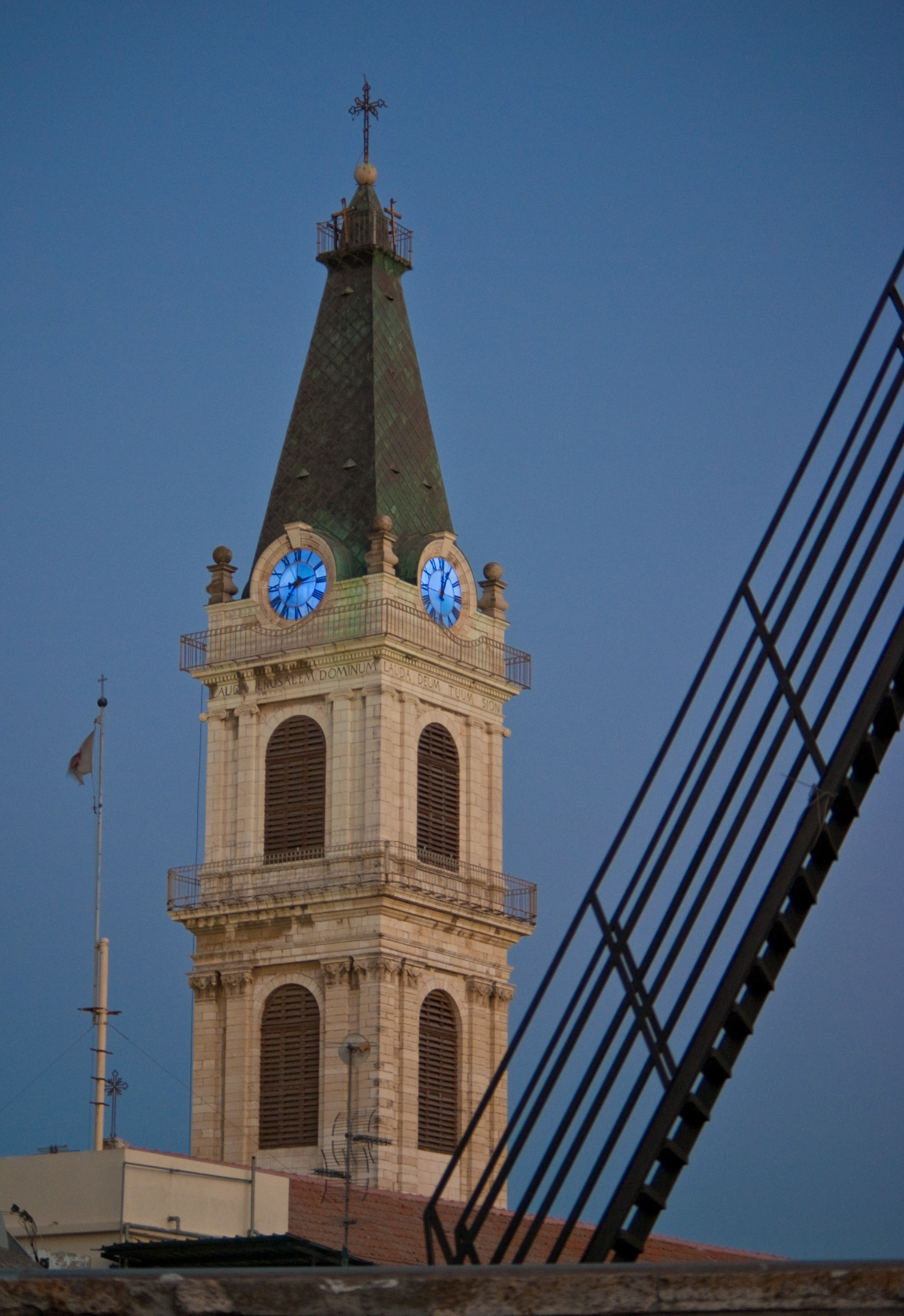
- Clock tower of the Monastery of Saint Saviour

- Location within Jerusalem
- Interactive map of Monastery of Saint Saviour, or Abbey Church of St John the Evangelist (or Theologian)

Monastery information
- Other name: Spanish: San Salvador
- Order: Franciscan Order
- Established: 1560
- Dedication: Jesus as Saviour
- Diocese: Roman Catholic Archdiocese of Jerusalem

People
- Archbishop: Latin Patriarch of Jerusalem

Architecture
- Architect: Father Raffaelle Cingolani
- Style: Mannerism-influenced
- Completion date: 29 November 1885

Site
- Location: Old City of Jerusalem
- Coordinates: 31°46′44″N 35°13′39″E

The Monastery of Saint Saviour (Hebrew: מנזר סן סלוודור, romanized: Minzer San Salvador, Italian: Convento di San Salvatore) is a Franciscan monastery housing the headquarters of the Custody of the Holy Land and located on 1 Saint Francis Street, east of the New Gate in the Old City of Jerusalem.

The site was purchased from the Georgian Orthodox Church in 1560 with the permission of Sultan Suleiman the Magnificent of the Ottoman Empire, and the monastery was constructed in stages. The church building was erected in 1885, with a renovation in 1985. The site includes a printing press, an organ workshop, a library and a Catholic school.

== History ==
The monastery was built in several stages on a site purchased by the Franciscan Order from the Georgian Orthodox Church in 1558–59, with the permission of Sultan Suleiman the Magnificent.

Because the old church building was no longer considered sufficient for the needs of the parish, in 1850 Sultan Abdülmecid I granted the order permission to demolish the old church and build a new one in its place, under the condition that the new church be no larger than the old one. Official support for the construction of the church was provided by Austro-Hungarian Emperor Franz Joseph I during his visit to Jerusalem in 1869. Originally, Franz Joseph I made his contribution on the condition that the church would be built according to the plans of his own architect. Although the leaders of the Franciscan order rejected this condition, Franz Joseph agreed to contribute about 60,000 francs for the project. The construction took three years and was completed on 29 November 1885.

The church architect, Father Raffaelle Cingolani from Montecassiano, was inspired by the work of Italian architect Giacomo Barozzi da Vignola. The church was built in the typical style of a basilica. Unlike most church buildings built on an east–west axis with the apse and the altar in the east, Saint Saviour is built along a north–south axis. A clock tower is located on the side of the church.

In 1932, two stories were added to the clock tower in honour of the 700th anniversary of the death of Saint Anthony of Padua. In 1985, the church and monastery were renovated in honour of the 100th anniversary of its construction.

Over the years, a Catholic school for boys and girls, a printing press and an organ workshop were built in the monastery compound, and are still in operation today.

== See also ==
- Fathers of the Holy Sepulchre
