= New Gate =

Gate of the Old City of Jerusalem

New Gate, Old City of Jerusalem
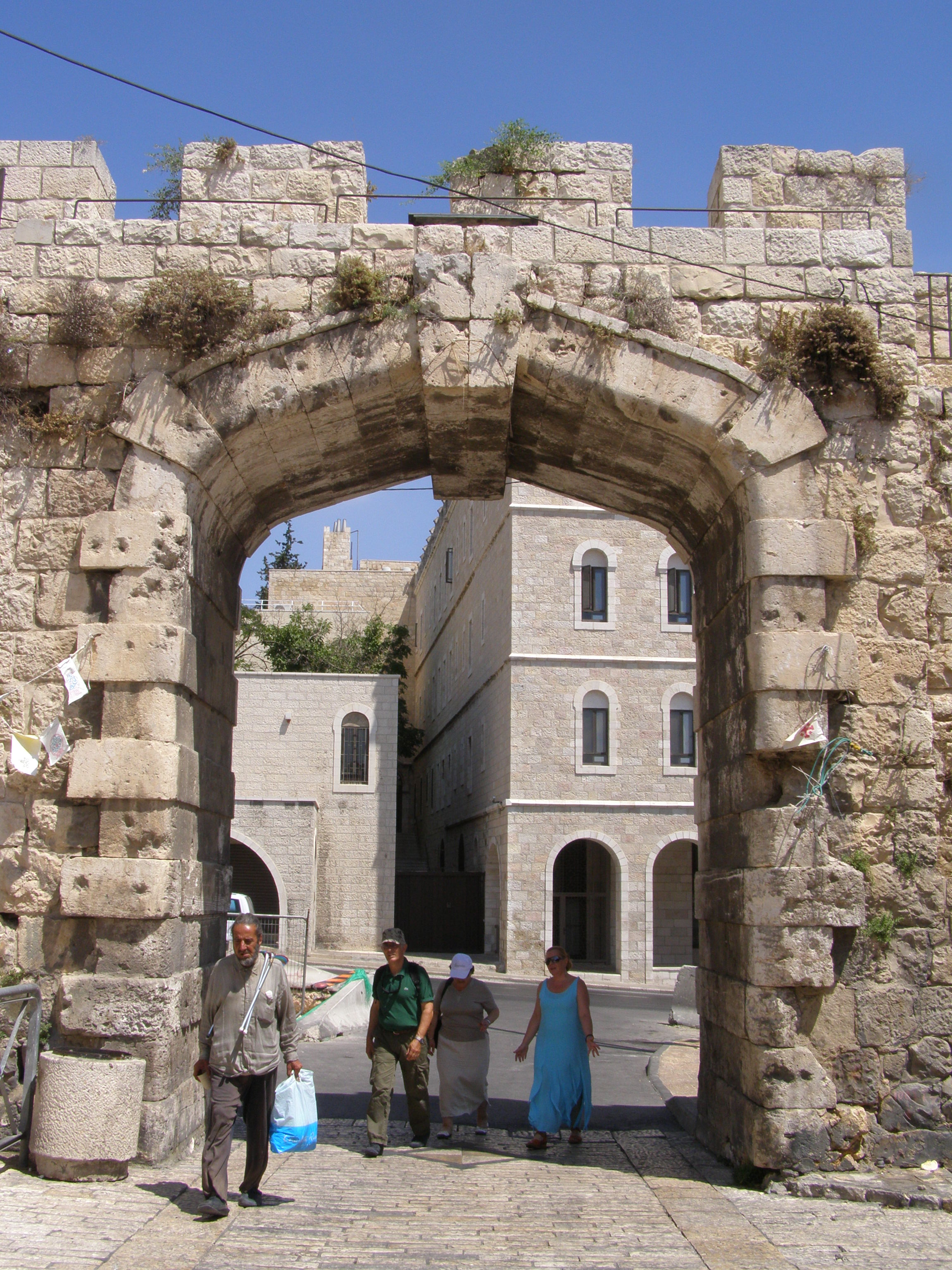

- Location within Old City of Jerusalem
- Alternative names: Bab al-Jadid es Sultan Abd ul Hamid II (Arabic for "New Gate of Sultan Abd ul Hamid II"); HaSha'ar HaHadash (Hebrew for "New Gate"); Gate of the Sultan

General information
- Type: Outer city wall postern gate
- Location: Western section of the northern wall of Jerusalem, Jerusalem
- Coordinates: 31°46′45.5″N 35°13′34.6″E
- Elevation: 790 metres (2,590 ft)
- Construction started: 1887
- Completed: 1889

The New Gate (Arabic: باب الجديد Bāb ij-Jdïd; Hebrew: השער החדש HaSha'ar HeChadash) is the newest of the gates of the Old City of Jerusalem. It was built in 1889 by the Ottomans under the directorship of the French consul and Franciscan brotherhood monkship order to provide direct access between the Christian Quarter and the new neighborhoods then going up outside the walls. The arched gate is decorated with crenelated stonework. The New Gate was built at the highest point of the present wall, at 790 metres (2,590 ft) above sea level.

== Names ==
The New Gate was the name used by the Ottoman administration. It was also known as Bab es Sultan Abd ul Hamid by the Arab workforce for the Ottoman Sultan Abdul Hamid II who allowed the building.

It should not be confused with the New Gate of the Second Temple complex mentioned in the Book of Jeremiah (Jer 26:10; 36:10) that served as entrance to the Great Sanhedrin's Hall of Hewn Stones, and was previously called the Benjamin Gate.

== History ==
=== Byzantine period ===
During the 3rd and 4th centuries the northern wall was rebuilt and improved by the Byzantines leaving no trace or record of a gate in this sector of the fortifications. There is no information about a gate preexisting at this point in the wall before the city was occupied by the Crusaders.

=== Crusader period ===
There is a suggestion that the Crusaders did maintain a small postern gate, named after the Order of St. Lazarus, just east of the Ottoman construction, for the use of troops stationed at Tancred's Tower (Goliath's Tower). Uncovered during drainage and sewage works in the area, it may have also been used by the knights of the Lepers Order also quartered there. Early records of the Crusades suggest the wall was breached after the Crusader occupation on the orders of Tancred of Hauteville, with the tower subsequently named after him. The breach may have been later converted into a gate.

The Crusader gate may have been sealed up following Saladin's capture of Jerusalem in 1187 because it did not conform to architectural style of fortifications used by the Muslim armies. The earlier Crusader gate had "...a roundabout entrance, dim approaches, and a tower that protruded from the line of fortifications." By contrast the earlier gates as well as the Ottoman gate are built within the city, and aligned with the facade of the wall.

=== Ottoman period ===
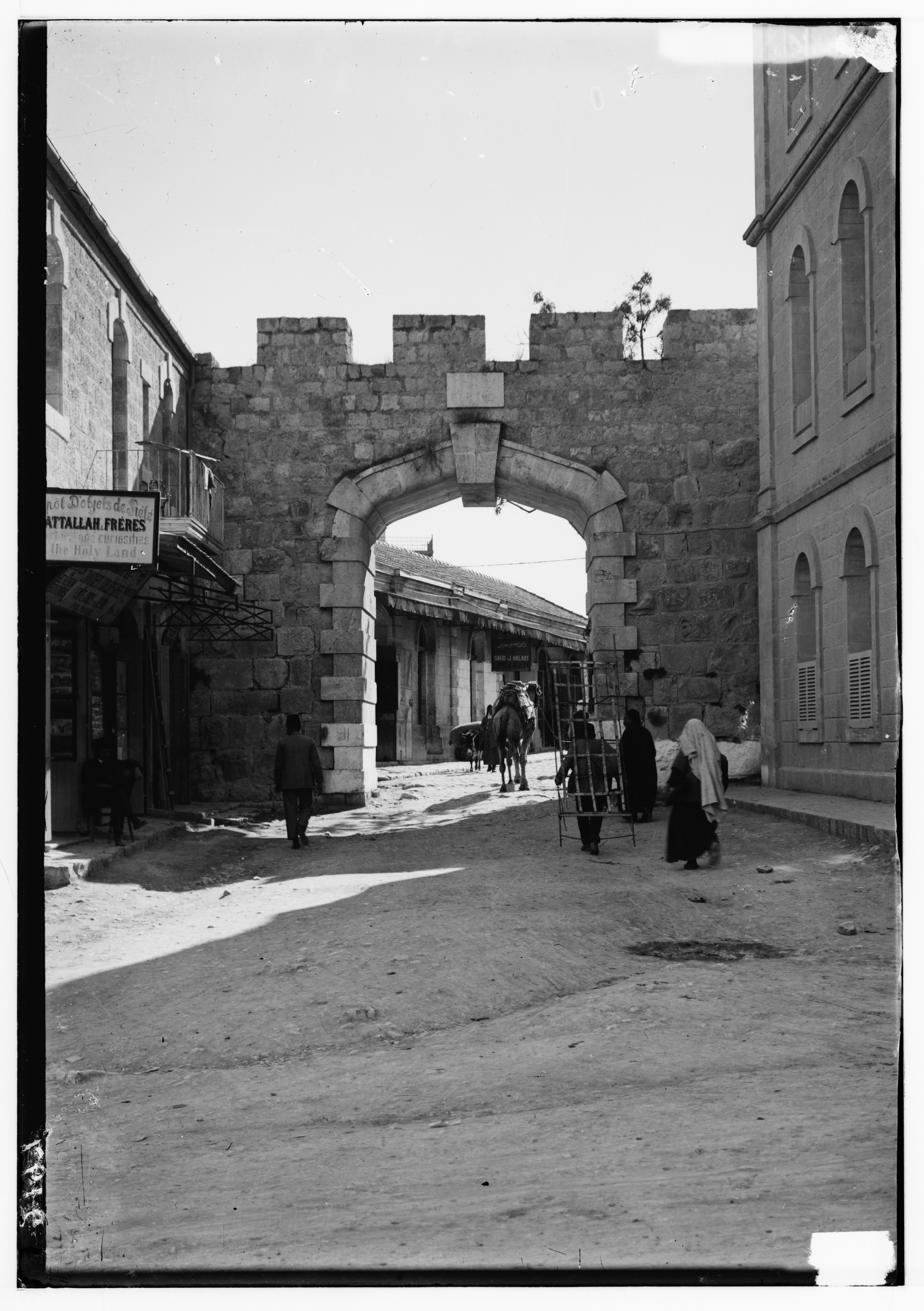
New Gate, 1890s

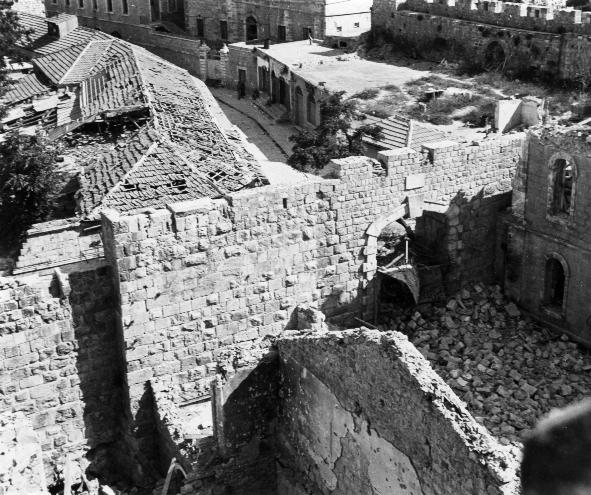
New Gate during battles for Jerusalem 1948

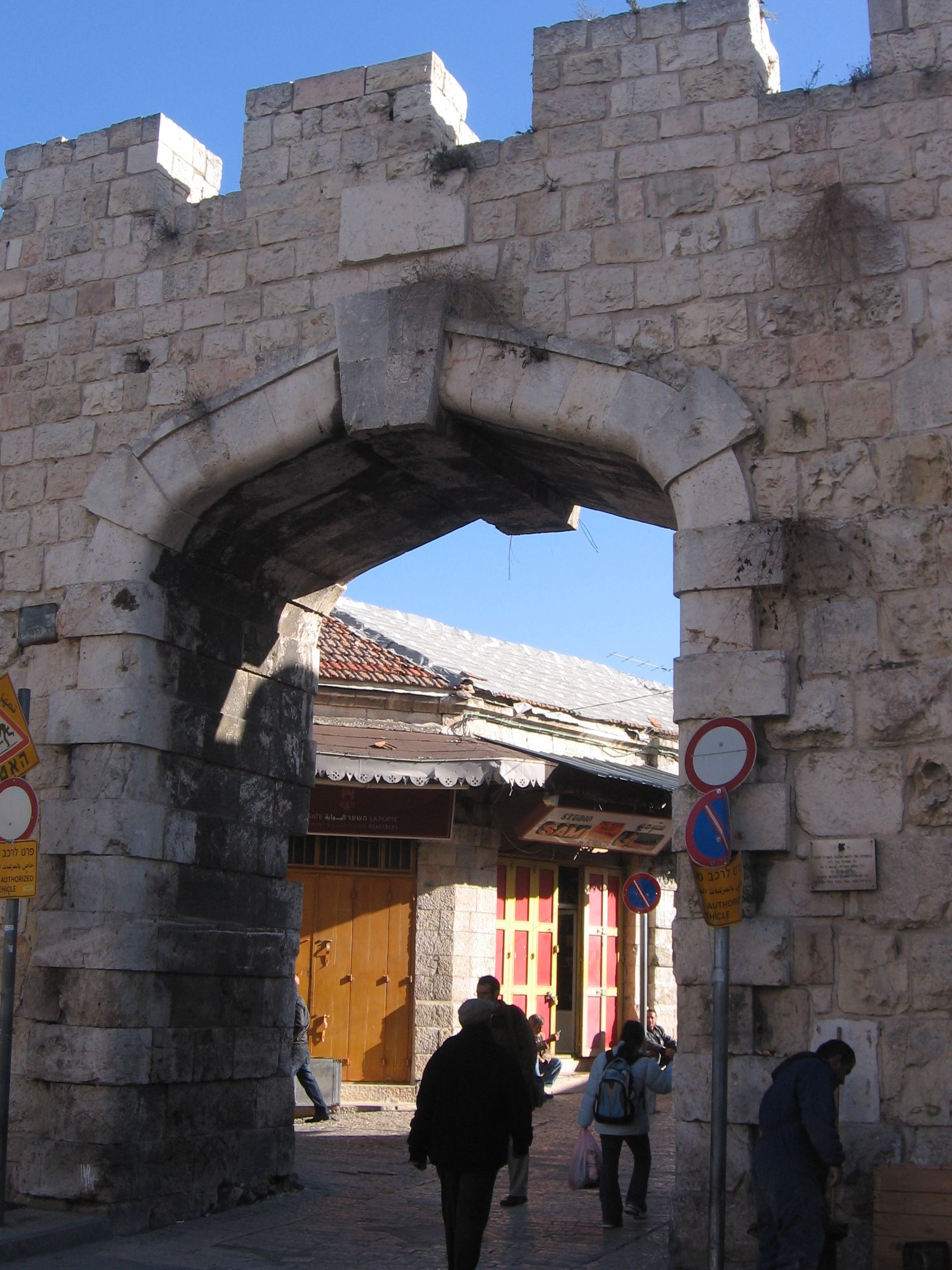
New Gate, 2009

The older gates were probably sealed by the external wall built in the 1530s by Suleyman the Magnificent. However, another gate was reported in the 16th century called the New Gate of the Serbian Monastery, that was used by the Franciscans while they were building the Church of St Saviour.

It was built at the request of the French consul to provide access to the Old City from the Notre Dame Hospice that was completed in 1886, and to provide Russian Christian pilgrims living at the Russian Compound (outside the Old City walls) direct access to the Church of the Holy Sepulchre in the Christian Quarter. Contrary to popular belief, Kaiser Wilhelm II during his visit to Jerusalem entered not through the New Gate, but through the "Hole in the Wall", made so that he wouldn't have to dismount his carriage to enter the city.

From the beginning of the First World War the headquarters of Roshen Bey, the most senior Ottoman military officer in the Jerusalem area, was located at the Notre Dame Hospice opposite the New Gate.

=== British Mandate ===
During the 1920s and 1930s the New Gate became the nearest gate to the modern city Jerusalem with the Christian Brothers' College located just inside its structure in the Old City. At this time the New Gate, as all gates to the Old City, included an iron gate which was operated by the police, and shut as required by the administrative regulations. On the afternoon of Friday, 23 August 1929, an unprovoked attack was staged by the Arabs from the Old City between the New and Damascus gates that resulted in the killing of several Jews after the Arabs were inflamed by the sermons during the noon prayers at Haram esh Sherif. From 1946 and until Independence the British Administration created a security zone between the New Gate and Jaffa Road, called euphemistically Bevingrad for Ernest Bevin, due to the terrorist activity from both sides. On November 15, 1945 the Stern Gang attempted to demolish part of the wall next to the New Gate, using a massive device that required ten men to transport and emplace; however it failed to function.

=== 1948 war and Jordanian period ===
During the 1948 Arab-Israeli war, David Shaltiel's Etzioni Brigade (Hagana) failed to capture East Jerusalem from the local Arab defenders reinforced by a company of the Arab Legion's 6th battalion during Operation Kedem. This occurred not because of Arab offensive action, which was restrained by orders of John Bagot Glubb, but because the Jewish demolition charge intended for the iron gate was detonated by a stray artillery shell that set the Arab wooden barricade in front of the New Gate on fire, halting the Stern Gang, Hagana and Irgun troops' advance just prior to the ceasefire announcement. Subsequently the Jordanian occupation administration had the gate sealed off.

=== 1967 war and Israeli period ===
The gate was reopened by the Israeli Army in 1967 and the iron gate removed following the capture of East Jerusalem during the Jordanian campaign.

The gate itself is maintained under the preservation orders, supervised by the Israel Antiquities Authority. The land around the New Gate is largely owned by the Latin Patriarchate and the Franciscan Custody of the Holy Land, which have refused to sell it to the Israeli government. It required many years to lease land from the Patriarchate between the New Gate and the Damascus Gate for a park.

In the current urban layout of Jerusalem the New Gate provides the quickest route from the Old City to West Jerusalem, including via Egged No.1 & 2 buses, via its HaSha'ar HaKhadash (New Gate) Road.

== Landmarks ==
There are several notable buildings near the New Gate, both inside the Old City behind the gate, and outside across the road. Inside the Old City are the Collège de La Salle/Collège des Frères (for boys), the Greek Orthodox St. Basil Monastery, and the Catholic Monastery of Saint Saviour. Under the Collège are the remains of Tancred's Tower (Goliath's Castle).

Notre-Dame de France is a Catholic monastery and guesthouse located across from the New Gate on Ha-Tsanchanim Road (Paratroopers Road), as is the St. Louis Hospital.
