= Tancred's Tower =

Former tower in Jerusalem's Old City walls

Tancred's Tower Qaṣr Jālūd, Qalʿat Jālūd, Burj Jālūd
- Part of Jerusalem's city walls

Site information
- Open to the public: Yes
- Condition: Ruins (first courses)

Location
- Coordinates: 31.7786°N 35.2261°E

Site history
- Materials: Limestone
- Battles/wars: Siege of 1099

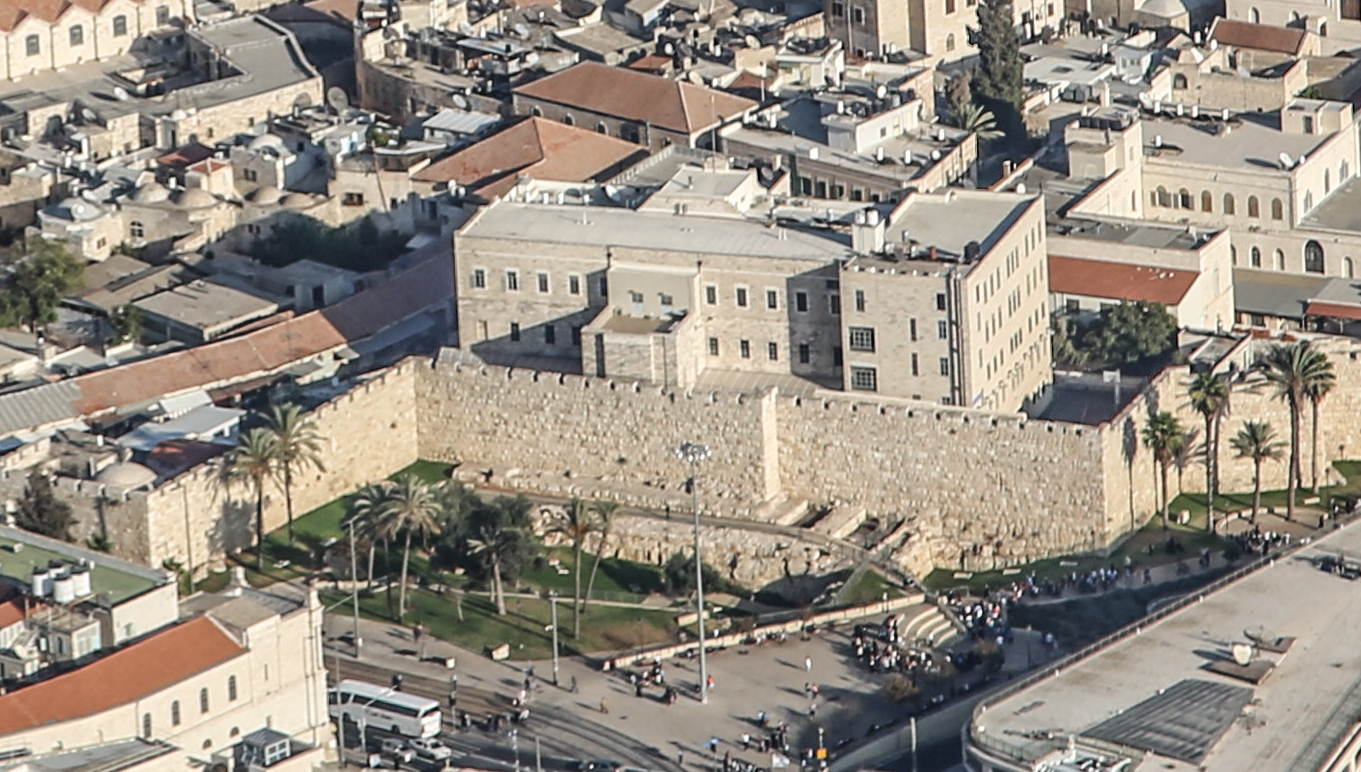
Remains of Tancred's Tower in front of the Ottoman city walls, and the Collège des Frères behind the walls (top)

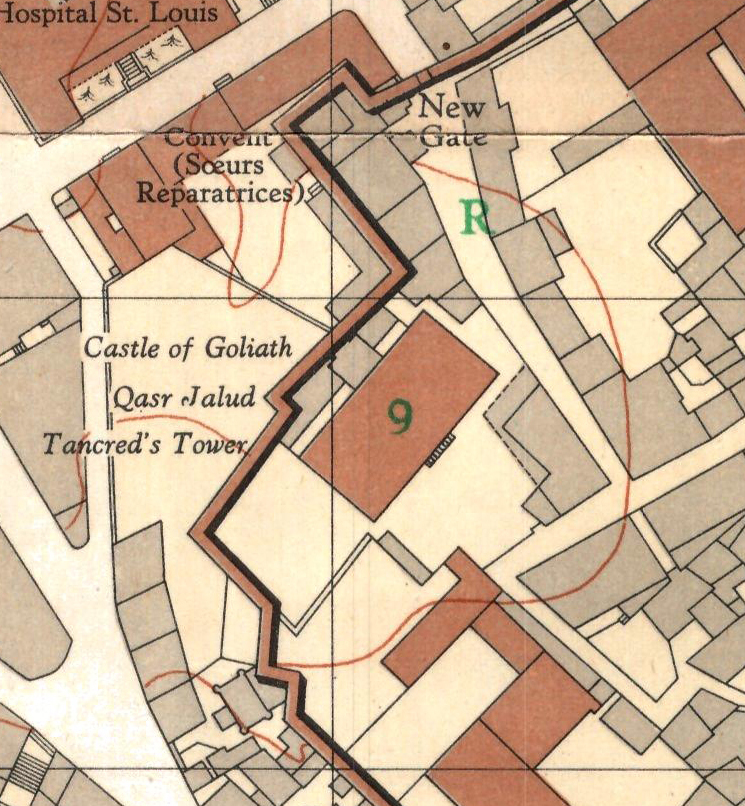
Qasr Jalud, the Palestine Survey, 1936. Building "9" is the Collège.

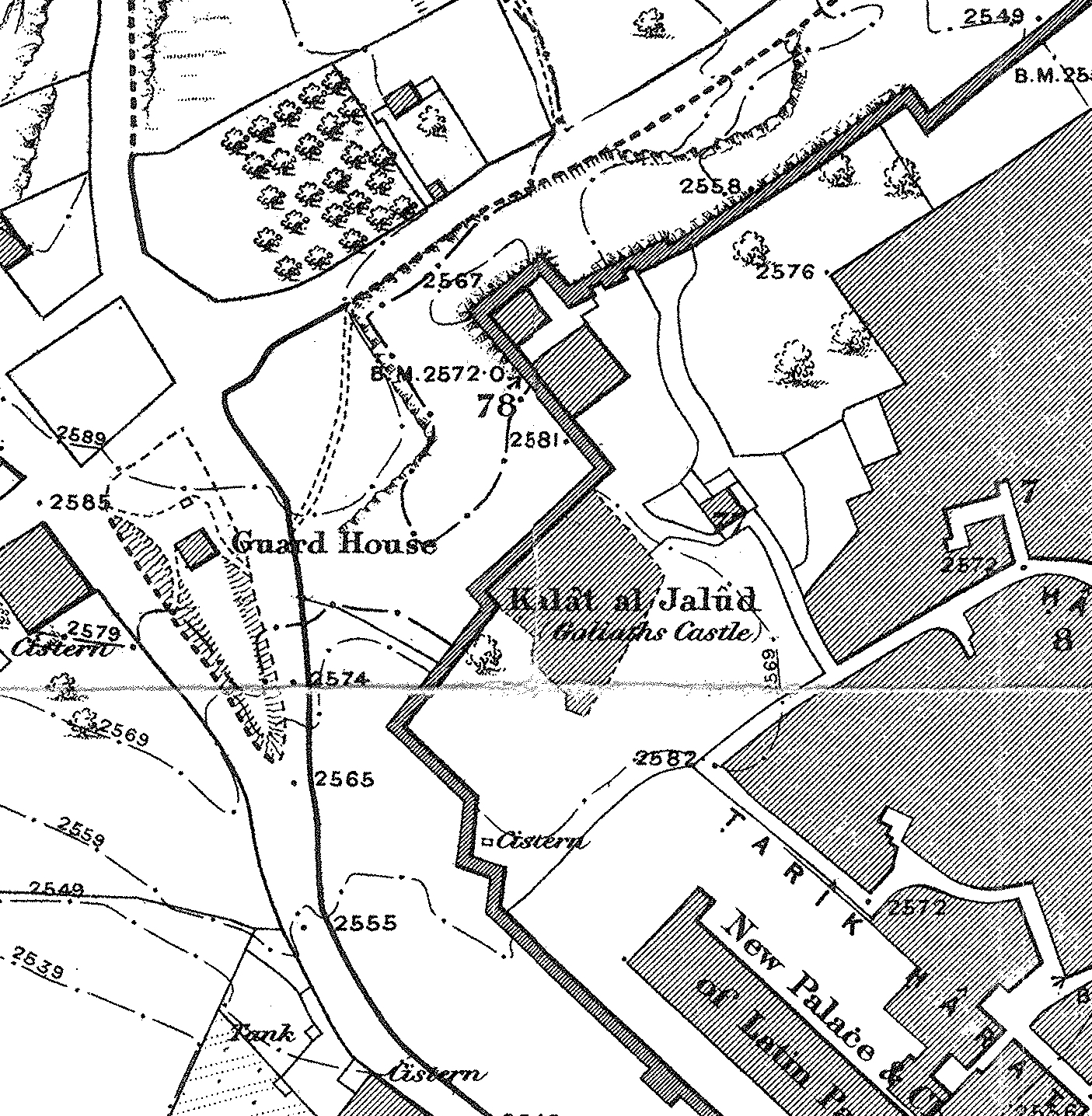
Kalat (Qalʿat) al Jalud, the Jerusalem Survey, 1865

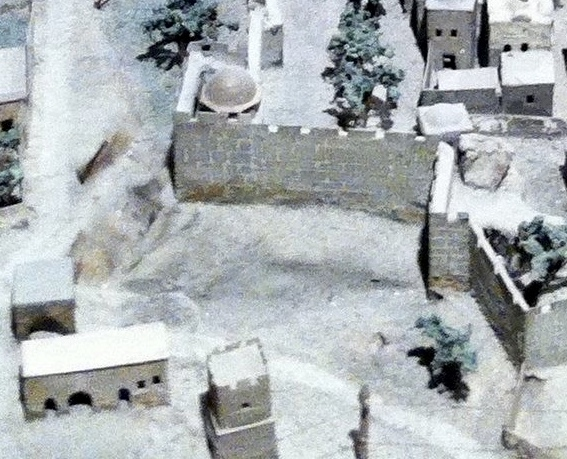
The area of Tancred's Tower in a city model created a century before the excavation of the tower remains (1864-1873)

Tancred's Tower, known in Arabic as Qasr (al-)Jalud ("Goliath's Castle", see below), was a large tower at the northwest corner of the Old City of Jerusalem, of which only meager remains were unearthed by archaeologists.

Today, much of the area of the original structure is beneath the Collège des Frères of the De La Salle Brothers. Parts of it are in the external base of the city wall where the section coming from the New Gate to the northeast meets the section coming from Jaffa Gate to the southeast.

== Names ==
The tower is known in Arabic as Qaṣr Jālūd/Jālūt ("Goliath's Castle") or Qalʿat Jālūd ("Goliath's Fortress") or Burj Jālūd ("Goliath's Tower"). (Note: Here, Jālūd may also be Jālūt, as with the placename Ayn Jalut. The article al-/el- may be present, hence these variations: Qasr/Ḳasr Jalud (قصر جالود), Qasr Jalut (قصر جالوت), Qasr al-Jalud, Qasr al-Jalut; Qalʿat/Ḳalʿat/Kalaat Jalud (قلعة جالود), Qalʿat Jalut, Qalʿat al-Jalud; Burj Jalud, Burj Jalut (برج جالوت), etc.) The name may be from traditions about Goliath or an allusion to its size or a reference to the Tower of David. To the Crusaders, it was the Turris Tancredi (Latin for "Tancred's Tower"), after Tancred of Antioch, the commander whose troops breached the Fatimid defenses at this specific point during the 1099 siege. There was also a 13th-century map where it is the Turris Nebulosa.

== History ==
The remains are of a large tower, probably first built in the 11th century during the Fatimid period, when the Christian community was forced by decree in 1063 to erect a new wall complete with towers in the north-western part of the city. Sources speak of a forewall, moat, and main wall. During the 1099 siege at the end of the First Crusade, the city and tower fell to the Franks, who later referred to it as Tancred's Tower because it was at this spot that the Italo-Norman leader first attempted to scale Jerusalem's city wall by ladder on 13 June 1099. During the Crusader reign over the city, there was a postern gate adjacent to the tower. Lepers were housed in the vicinity of the tower already around 1130, and later became organised as the crusading military order of Saint Lazarus. The tower was apparently expanded by the Ayyubids after Saladin's reconquest of the city in 1187, but it was destroyed along with the entire city wall sometime later, possibly in 1219, when Ayyubid ruler al-Mu'azzam Isa razed most of the city fortifications. Part of the remains of the tower on the inside of the Ottoman walls were razed in 1876, when the Collège des Frères was built.

== Excavation ==
The remains of the tower were discovered during excavations led by Dan Bahat and Menashe Ben-Ari of the Department of Antiquities in 1971–72.

== Description ==
The tower footprint, which measures approximately 35 × 35 metres, was found to protrude by some 3 metres from underneath the 16th-century Ottoman city wall, built on top of the medieval tower's ruins, which were levelled for the purpose. It was found that the tower was separated from the city wall on its north and west sides by a street. The contemporary city wall follows closely the tower's outline, and is bordered to the north and west by two moat segments, excavated to a depth of c. 7 metres.
