= St. Joseph's Church, Nazareth =

Catholic church in Nazareth

Coordinates: 32°42′11″N 35°17′54″E

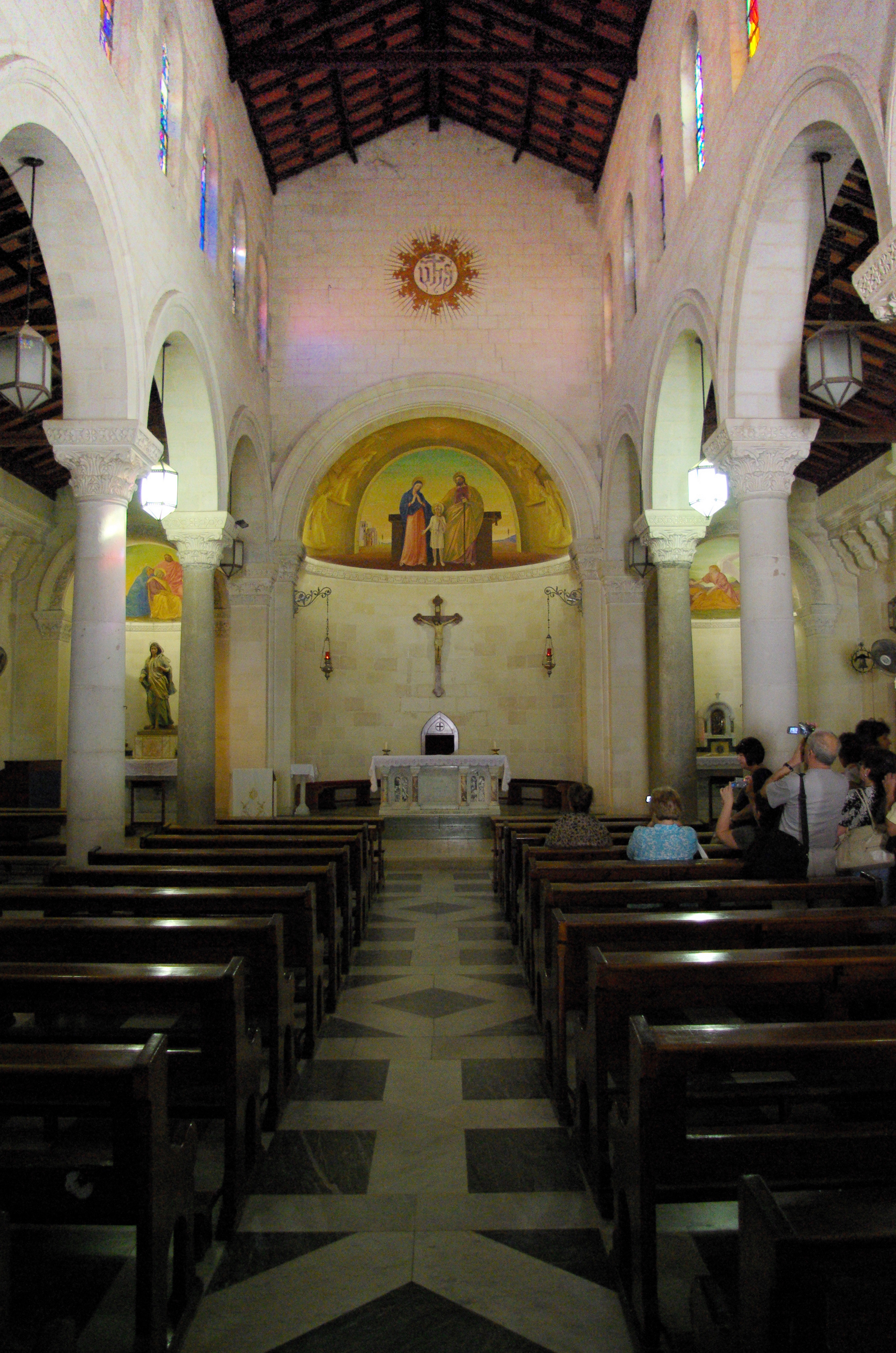
The Church interior

St. Joseph's Church is a Franciscan Roman Catholic church in the Old City of Nazareth, modern-day Northern Israel. It was built in 1914 over the remains of much older churches. It is located close to the Church of the Annunciation. It was built in the Romanesque Revival style.

The church is built on the site of the Church of Nutrition quoted by the pilgrim Arculf about 670 in "De locis sanctis" (II, 26), then a church of the crusaders of the Kingdom of Jerusalem, whose vestiges are under the crypt, and a Franciscan church built in the 17th century. This history is described by the Franciscan Quaresmius in his "Historica, theologica et moralis terrae sanctae elucidatio", written between 1616 and 1626, but merely affirms the existence ab antiquo of the tradition of a cult in this place, without giving evidence.

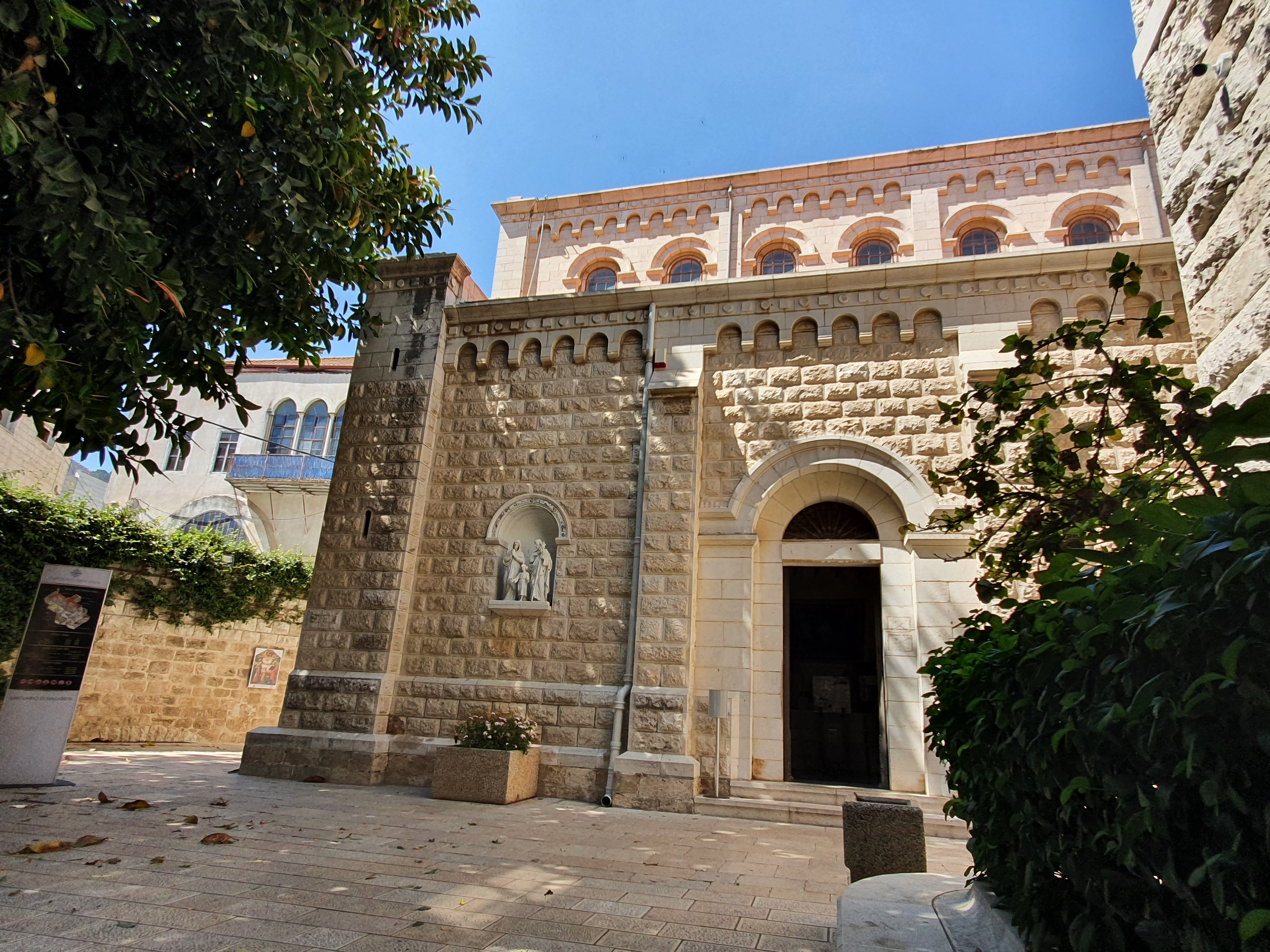
The Church from the outside. In the left part there are statues of Saint Joseph, Jesus and Mary.
