= St. Nicodemus and St. Joseph of Arimathea Church =

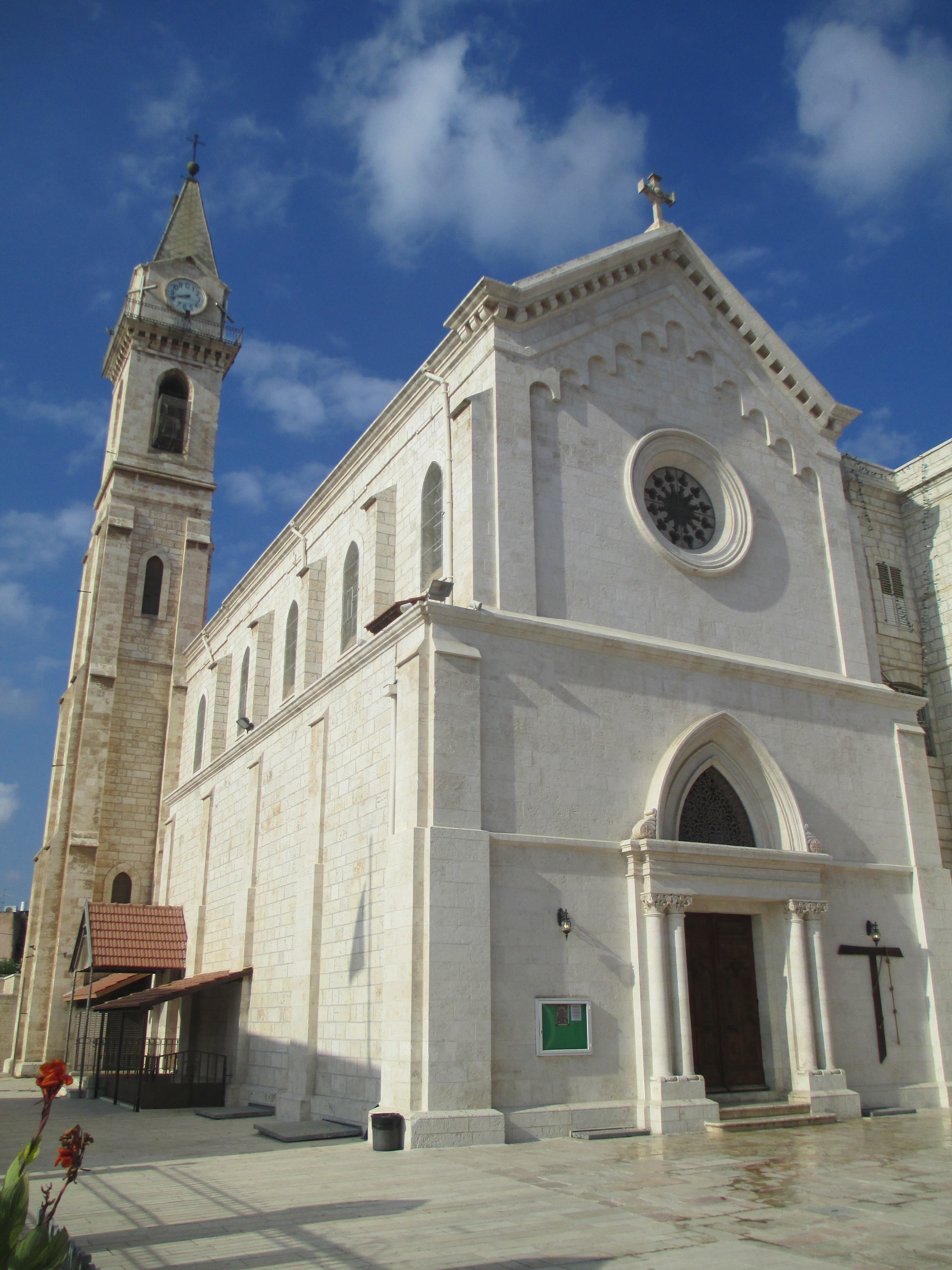
- St. Nicodemus and St. Joseph of Arimathea Church
- 31.9269°N 34.8720°E
- Location: Ramla
- Country: Israel
- Denomination: Roman Catholic Church

The St. Nicodemus and St. Joseph of Arimathea Church is a Catholic church located in Ramla, the capital city of Central District in Israel.

The present church was built in the nineteenth century on a site that Christians claim that is the biblical Arimathea, the hometown of Joseph of Arimathea, a character who, according to the Gospel account, was the owner of the tomb in which the body of Jesus was deposited after the crucifixion.

The church is managed by the order of the Franciscans, which has a square bell tower and a painting on the altar attributed to Titian and was donated by the city of Madrid in 1846.

== See also ==
- Roman Catholicism in Israel
- St. Joseph of Arimathea

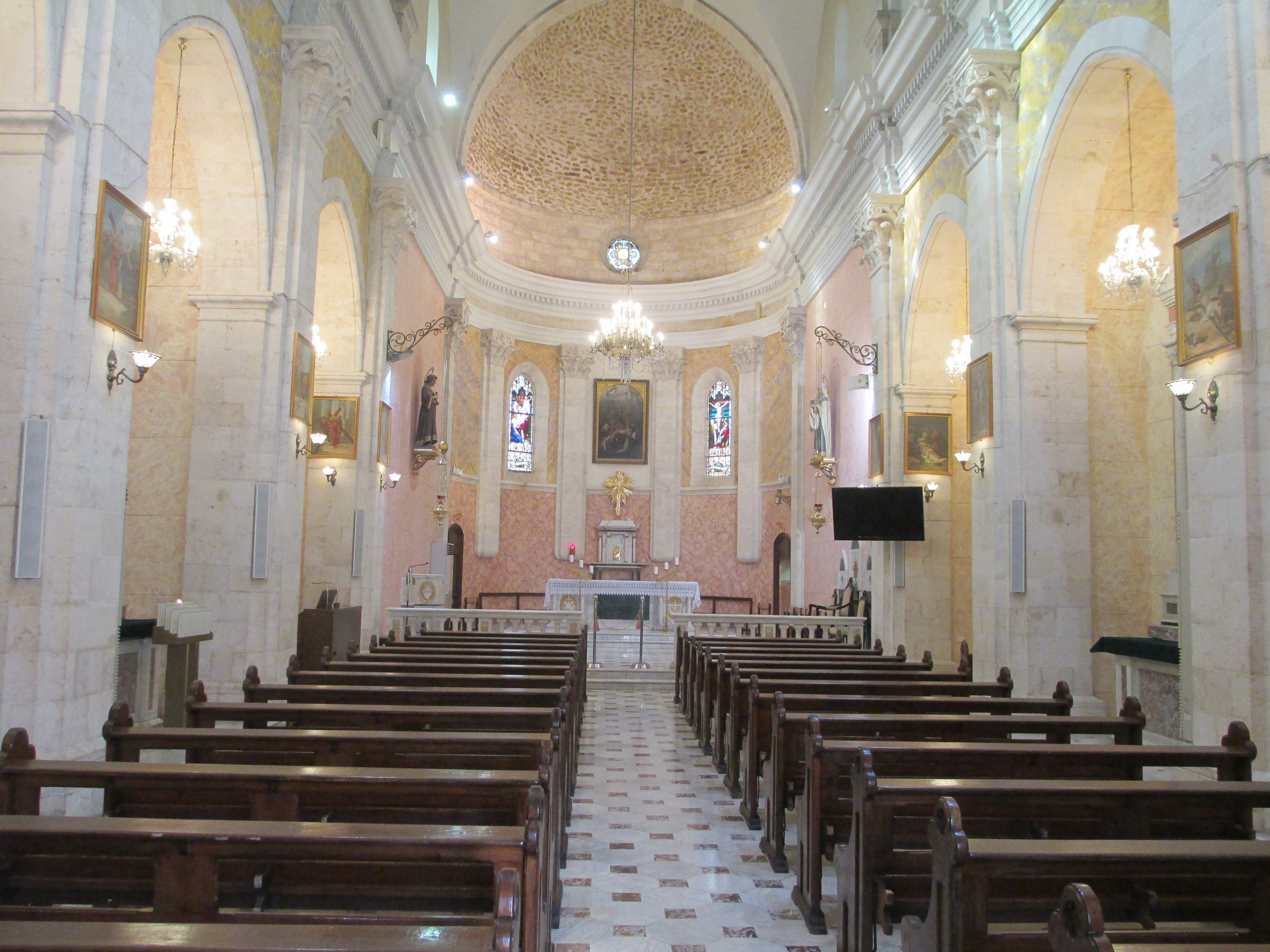
Internal View
