= St. Peter's Church, Tiberias =

St. Peter's Church
- כנסיית פטרוס הקדוש
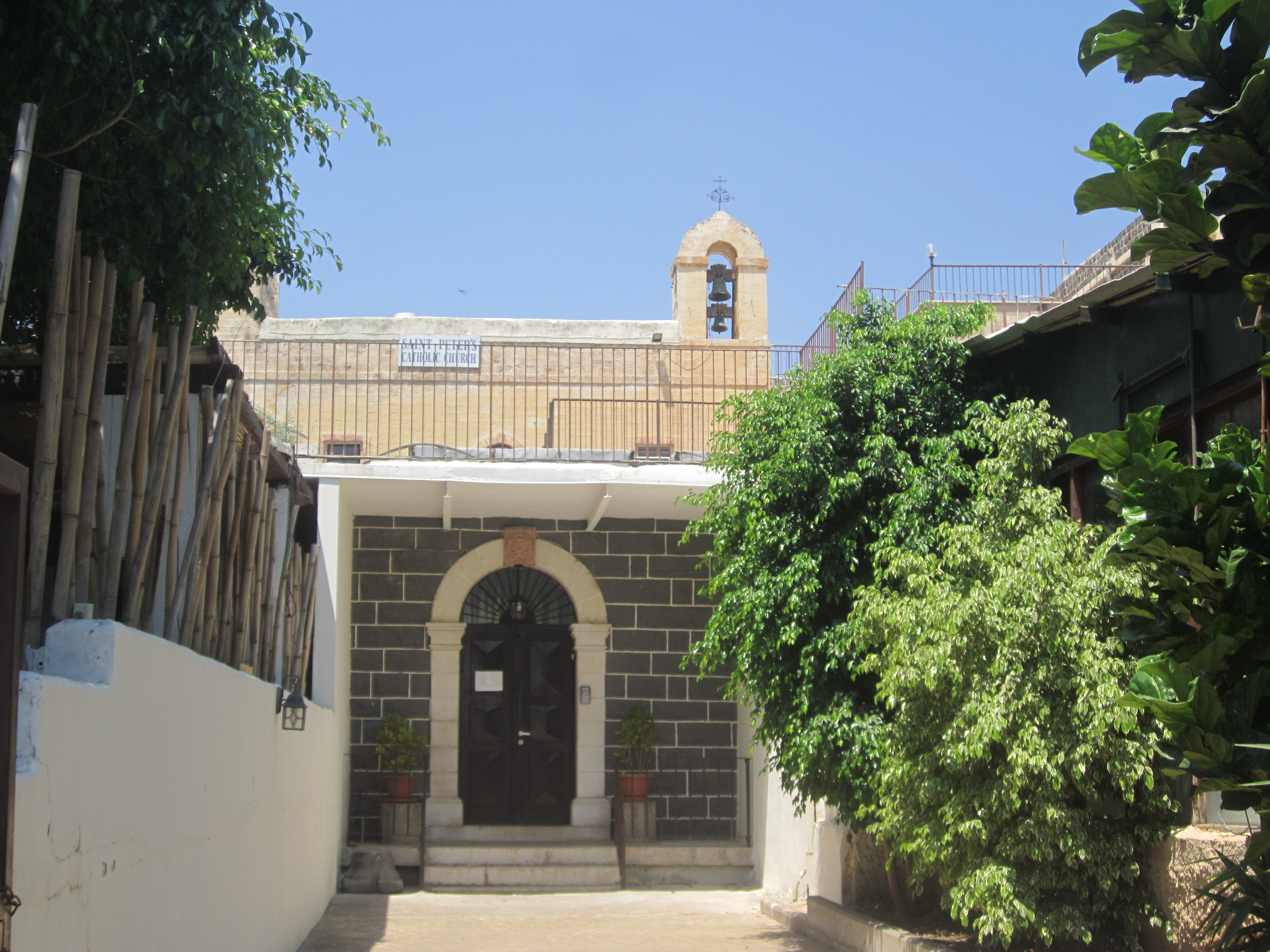

- Location within Israel
- 32.78838°N 35.54341°E
- Location: Tiberias
- Address: Saint Peter's Church, HaYarden Street 1, P.O.B. 179, 1410101 Tiberias
- Country: Israel
- Denomination: Roman Catholic Church
- Website: www.saintpeterstiberias.org

History
- Status: Active
- Founded: C. 1100 AD

Administration
- Province: Northern District
- Archdiocese: Latin Patriarchate of Jerusalem

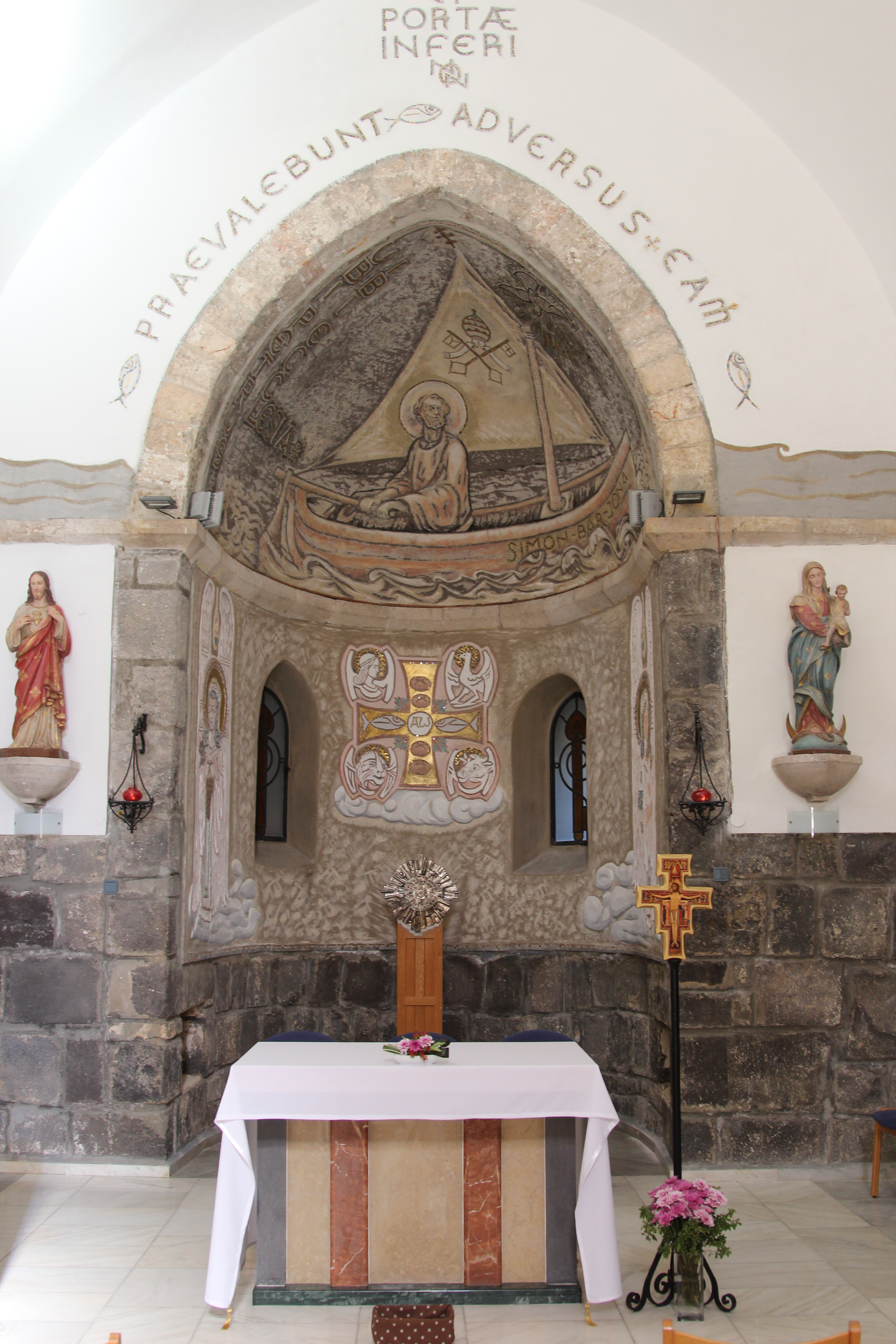
Church altar

The St. Peter's Church (Hebrew: כנסיית פטרוס הקדוש Latin: Ecclesia Sancti Petri) is a religious building belonging to the Catholic Church which is next to a monastery in Tiberias, a town on the western shore of the Sea of Galilee, in the Lower Galilee, in northern District of Israel. The church is named after St. Peter one of the apostles of Jesus, because it is near where Catholics believe that St. Peter was a fisherman in Galilee.

The church was founded in the early twelfth century by the Crusaders. With the conquest of Tiberias by Muslims after the defeat of Christians in the Battle of Hattin in 1187 it became a mosque.

During the eighteenth century, the interest of the members of the Franciscan order in the church resulted in occasional visits, first at the feast of St. Peter, and eventually services were permanent renewed. During this century the Franciscans retook control of the church.

In 1833 a replica of the statue of St. Peter by Arnolfo di Cambio in the Vatican was brought, and in 1847 a monastery was established near the church.

In 1870 the current facade of the temple was built. After World War II a memorial wall was built depicting various issues related to the Catholic Church in Poland and a central image of the Black Madonna of Czestochowa.

== See also ==
- Roman Catholicism in Israel
- Latin Patriarchate of Jerusalem
