= Fathers of the Holy Sepulchre =

In the beginning of the 20th century the Fathers of the Holy Sepulchre, or Guardians of the Holy Sepulchre, were six or seven Franciscan fathers, who along with as many lay brothers kept watch over the Church of the Holy Sepulchre and its sanctuaries.

According to the 1913 edition of the Catholic Encyclopedia:

To the right of the Sacred Tomb in the Church of the Holy Sepulchre is the Chapel of Saint Mary Magdalene, which opens into the 10th-century Chapel of the Apparition of Christ to His Blessed Mother, served by the Franciscan fathers and containing their choir. Just off this chapel is the small damp monastery that 13th century has been the abode of the Fathers of the Holy Sepulchre. The band is chosen every three months from the Monastery of Saint Saviour, to lead the difficult confined life. Nonetheless, they always finds eager volunteers. The convent is accessible only from the basilica, which under Ottoman rule was in charge of Muslim guards. The keys which lock the basilica shut the friars off from the outer world leaving their only means of communication as aperture in the main portal, through which they receive provisions from Saint Saviour's. Every afternoon the fathers conduct a pilgrimage to the sanctuaries of the basilica, and at midnight, while chanting their Office, they go in procession to the tomb of the Saviour, where they intone the Benedictus.

Austrian Emperor Franz Joseph, in 1869, on his way to the opening of the Suez Canal, visited the Holy Land. He conferred numerous benefactions on Saint Saviour's, and induced the Ottoman Empire to remove the stable which obstructed the light and air of the little monastery of the Holy Sepulchre. He also convinced the Turks to permit the erection of a bell-tower. On 25 September 1875, these bells pealed forth for the first time in 700 years summoning the faithful to worship in the Church of the Holy Sepulchre.

The superiors must be alternately Italian, French, and Spanish. The rest of the community of Saint Saviour's generally numbers about 25 Fathers and 55 lay brothers. They are engaged in the various activities of the convent, located within the monastic enclosure. In the early 20th century, besides the church of Saint Saviour (the Latin parish church of Jerusalem) the convent included an orphanage, a Catholic parish school for boys, a printing office, carpenter's and ironmonger's shops, a mill run by steam, and the largest library in Jerusalem.

== See also ==
- Custody of the Holy Land
- Order of the Holy Sepulchre
- Brotherhood of the Holy Sepulchre
