= Vincent de Paul (disambiguation) =

Vincent de Paul (1581–1660) was a French Catholic priest who dedicated himself to serving the poor.

Vincent de Paul may also refer to:

- Vincent De Paul (actor)

== See also ==
- DePaul University
- Saint-Vincent-de-Paul (disambiguation)
- St. Vincent de Paul Church (disambiguation)
- St. Vincent de Paul School (disambiguation)
- Society of Saint Vincent de Paul
- The Saint Vincent de Paul Food Pantry Stomp
