= List of church buildings in Jerusalem =

This is a list of church buildings in Jerusalem, including churches and monasteries.

== Church of the Holy Sepulchre ==
- Church of the Holy Sepulchre in the Christian Quarter, home of six denominations: Catholic, Greek Orthodox, Armenian Apostolic, Syriac Orthodox, Coptic Orthodox and Ethiopian Orthodox.

== Oriental Orthodox ==
- Cathedral of St. James, Armenian Orthodox church in Armenian quarter
- St. Toros Church, Armenian Orthodox church in Armenian quarter
- Church of the Holy Archangels, Armenian Orthodox church in Armenian quarter
- St. Mark's Monastery, Syriac Orthodox monastery located on Ararat St. in the Armenian quarter.
- Deir es-Sultan, Coptic monastery in the Christian Quarter.
- Ethiopian Church – Ethiopian Orthodox

== Eastern Orthodox ==
- Church of John the Baptist, Greek Orthodox church in Muristan area of the Christian Quarter.
- Holy Trinity Cathedral in Jerusalem (Russian Orthodox)
- St. George monastery and church, Greek Orthodox in Armenian quarter.
- Monastery of Holy Archangels, Greek Orthodox monastery in the Christian Quarter.
- Church of Maria Magdalene – Russian Orthodox
- Church of St Alexander Nevsky – Russian Orthodox
- Monastery of the Cross – Greek Orthodox
- Romanian Orthodox Church, part of the Romanian Patriarchy's Representation to the Holy Places
- Russian Convent of the Ascension on the Mount of Olives, with the Church of the Ascension and the Church of the Finding of the Head of St John the Baptist – Russian Orthodox
- St. Symeon of Katamonas, church and convent – Greek Orthodox

== Eastern Catholic ==
- Cathedral of Our Lady, a Melkite Greek cathedral in the Christian Quarter.
- Church of St. Thomas, cathedral of the Syriac Catholic Rite
- Maronite Convent, Maronite church in Armenian quarter of the Old City
- Church of Our Lady of Sorrows, Armenian Catholic

== Roman Catholic ==
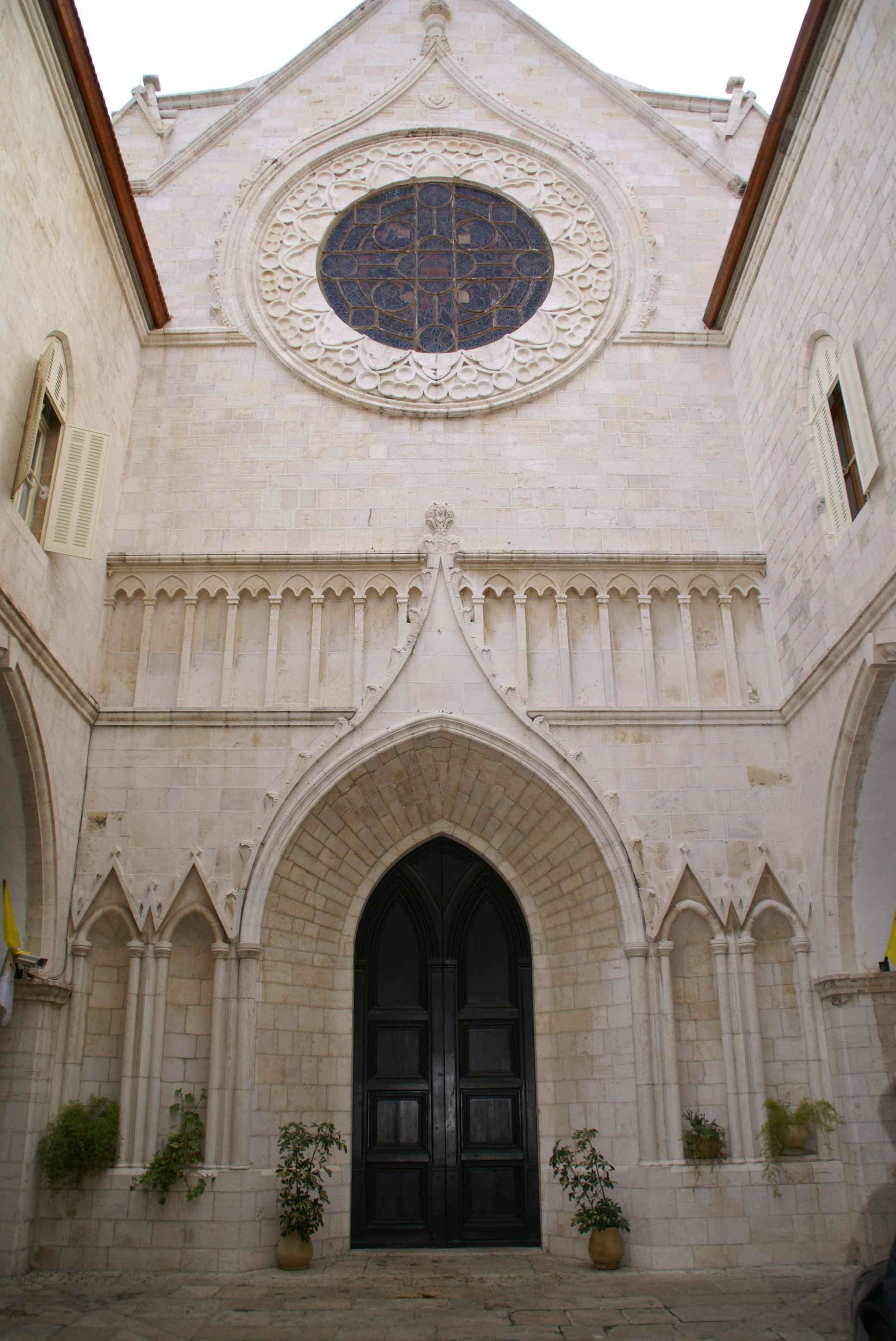
Co-Cathedral of the Most Holy Name of Jesus

- Co-Cathedral of the Most Holy Name of Jesus, Roman Catholic cathedral in Christian Quarter.
- Monastery of Saint Saviour, Franciscan monastery in Christian Quarter.
- Dominus Flevit Church, Franciscan church on Mount of Olives.
- Church of Bethphage, Franciscan church on Mount of Olives.
- Church of All Nations, Catholic church on Mount of Olives.
- Dormition Abbey, Jerusalem, Benedictines
- Abbey of Saint Mary, Benedictine abbey east of Old City.
- Monastery including Church of the Condemnation and Imposition of the Cross and Flagellation Church, Franciscan monastery of two churches.
- Convent of the Sisters of Zion
- Pater Noster Church, Jerusalem,
- Church of Saint Anne, Missionaries of Africa
- Church of Saint Peter in Gallicantu, Assumptionists
- Church of the Holy Family, Jerusalem
- Church of the Pater Noster, Carmelite Nuns
- Church of Saint Mary of the Latins
- St. Stephen's Basilica, Jerusalem, Dominican
- Church of Saint John the Baptist, Ein Karem, Franciscan
- Chapel of Saint Vincent de Paul, Jerusalem
- Church of the Visitation, Franciscan

== Protestant ==
- Christ Church, a 19th-century Protestant church in Armenian Quarter
- St. George's Cathedral, Anglican cathedral (of the Episcopal Church in Jerusalem and the Middle East)
- Church of the Redeemer, Jerusalem, Lutheran cathedral (of two denominations: Arab-speaking Evangelical Lutheran Church in Jordan and the Holy Land, and German-speaking community of the Evangelical (Protestant) Church in Germany) located in Christian Quarter
- St Andrew's Church, is a congregation presbyterian of the Church of Scotland

== Ruins ==
- Church of Saint Mary of the Germans
- Monastery of the Virgins
- Crusader Church of St. Thomas Alemannorum (possibly misread from "Armeniorum"), in ruins in Armenian quarter

== See also ==
- Christianity in Israel
