= Church of Saint John the Baptist, Jerusalem =

Church of Saint John the Baptist, Jerusalem may refer to:

- Church of Saint John the Baptist, Ein Karem, Jerusalem, a Catholic church traditionally considered to be built over the place where John the Baptist was born, in Ein Karem, near Jerusalem
- Greek Orthodox Church of Saint John the Baptist, Jerusalem, a small church in the Christian Quarter of Jerusalem

== See also ==
- Saint John the Baptist Church (disambiguation)
