= Church of the Visitation =

Catholic church in Jerusalem

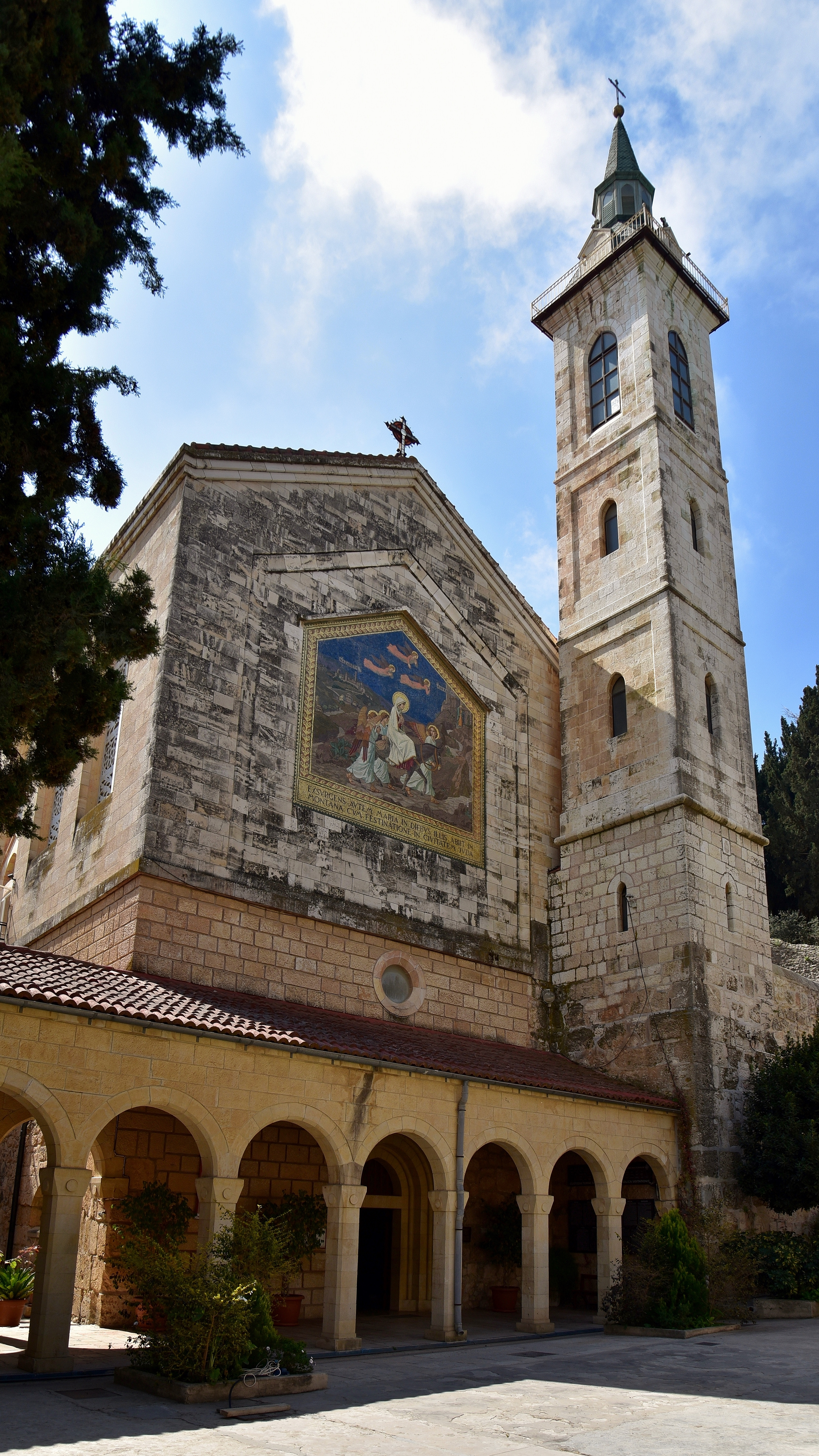
- Exterior view

Religion
- Affiliation: Roman Catholic
- Leadership: Franciscan Order

Location
- Location: Ein Karem, Jerusalem
- Interactive map of Church of the Visitation
- Palestine grid: 1651/1302
- Coordinates: 31°45′52″N 35°09′28″E

Architecture
- Architect: Antonio Barluzzi
- Completed: 1955

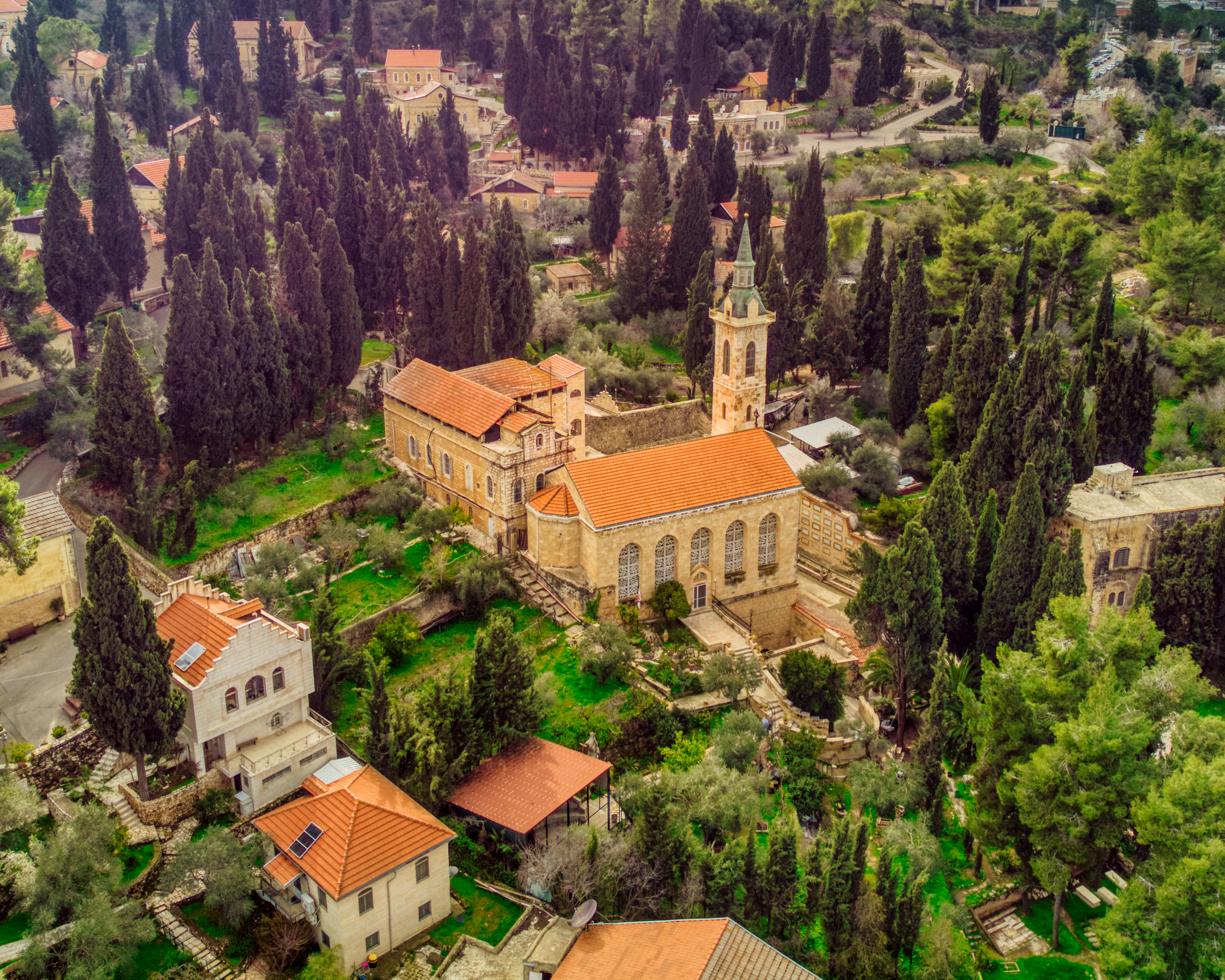
Church of the Visitation

The Church of the Visitation (Hebrew: כנסיית הביקור, romanized: Knesiyat HaBikur; formerly the Abbey Church of St John in the Woods) is a Catholic church in Ein Karem, Jerusalem, and honors the Visitation made by the Virgin Mary, the mother of Jesus, to Elizabeth, the mother of John the Baptist (Luke 1:39–56). This is the site where tradition says that Mary recited her song of praise, the Magnificat, one of the most ancient Marian hymns.

== Tradition ==
The Bible does not give a precise location for the home of Elizabeth and Zechariah, stating only that Mary went to "a town in the hill country of Judea" (Luke 1:39). One tradition attributes the construction of the first church of Ein Karem to Empress Helena of Constantinople, Constantine I's mother, who identified the site as the home of John's father, Zechariah.

The 2nd-century apocryphal Protoevangelium of James (22:3) tells the story of Elizabeth finding refuge in a cleft in the mountain opened by God for her and baby John. After some early references that mention Elizabeth's 'cave', the German pilgrim Theodosius explicitly writes in 530 that tradition placed Elizabeth's 'house' at Ein Karem. In the so-called Jerusalem Lectionary, containing the liturgical calendar of the Church of Jerusalem, among the 28 pilgrimages of the 7th and 8th centuries one finds the following: "August 28th. In the village of Einquarim, in the church of the worthy Elizabeth, commemoration of her." Anglican cleric, Canon Peter C. Nicholson, identifies the Byzantine shrine whose remains were discovered under the modern Church of the Visitation, as the most likely candidate for this ancient "church of the worthy Elizabeth".

== Archaeology ==
Bellarmino Bagatti excavated the site in 1938.

=== Byzantine period ===
Archaeologists found a Byzantine cistern in the courtyard and, more significantly, the remains of a Byzantine chapel over which the later churches were erected.

=== Crusader period ===
From the Crusader conquest of the Holy Land onwards, three locations in Ein Karem became connected with the life of St John the Baptist and turned into points of interest for pilgrims: a cave within the village, a site on a hill south of it, and the village's main water fountain. The events connected to the sites are the meeting between Mary and her cousin Elizabeth, the home of Zachary and Elizabeth, the birth of John, and the hiding place of Elizabeth and John. The Crusaders erected two main churches in Ein Karem, the precursors of what are today the Church of St John the Baptist and the Church of the Visitation. After the departure of the Crusaders, the different traditions shifted back and forth between the two locations.

At the site of the Church of the Visitation, the Crusaders erected a two-story church dedicated to the meeting between Elizabeth and Mary over the ancient ruins they found here..

=== Ayyubid and Mamluk period ===
When the Crusaders were pushed out of the Holy Land, the church gradually deteriorated. In the 14th century it was for a while under the care of Armenian monks, but in 1480 Felix Fabri reports: "In this chapel there are broken altars and ruined vaults; on the walls are ancient paintings, and both at the upper and the lower building shrubs and grasses grow upon the vaults. . . . Once there was here a fine and stately church, and monks dwelt in cells beside it; but now alas! it has become the ruined house of one most miserable Saracen."

=== Ottoman period ===
The Franciscan Custody of the Holy Land bought the plot of land with the ruined Crusader complex from an Arab family in 1679.

Only in 1862 did the Franciscans begin reconstruction of the lower level of the church.

=== British Mandate period ===
In 1937 the Franciscans excavated the grounds. Design and construction of the upper level of the structure began in 1938, and was completed by Italian architect Antonio Barluzzi in 1955.

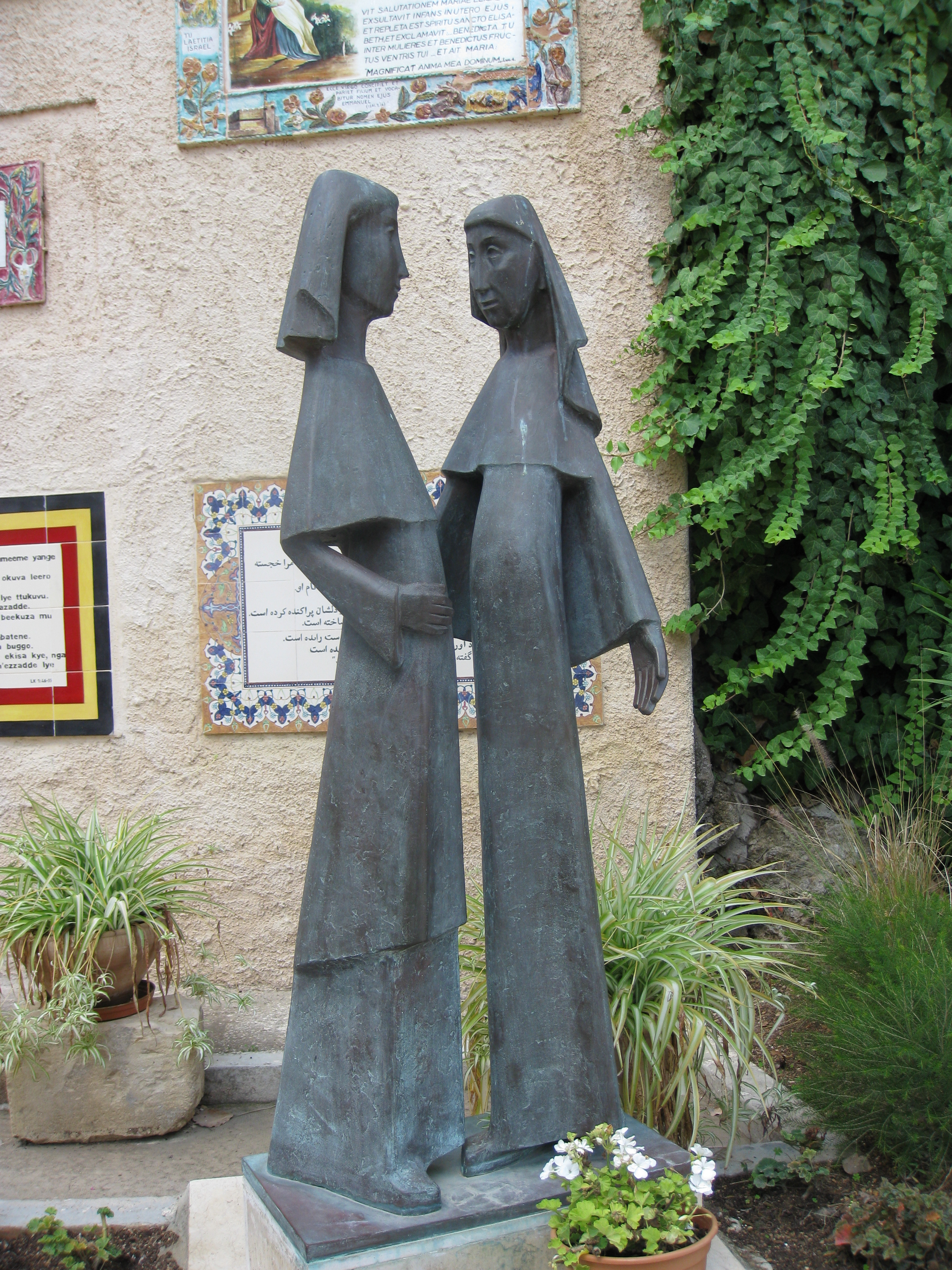
Courtyard, statue of the Visitation

== Description ==
=== Courtyard, exterior and annexes ===
The courtyard contains a statue of Mary and Elizabeth, and on the wall opposite the entrance to the lower church are forty-two ceramic tablets bearing the verses of the Magnificat in as many languages. On the facade of the upper church is a striking mosaic commemorating the Visitation. Next to the church proper, a Crusader hall of the 12th century survived in good condition.

=== Lower church ===
The lower church contains a narrow medieval barrel-vaulted crypt ending with a well-head from which, according to tradition, Elizabeth and her infant drank. The well is connected to a Roman or Byzantine overflow pipe running under the medieval floor. Also preserved are remains of the ancient church and beautiful mosaic floors.

The rock with a cleft next to the entrance of the medieval crypt is said to mark the site where the mountain opened up to hide Elizabeth and the infant John from Herod's soldiers – this is the "Rock of Concealment". This tradition is based on the 2nd-century apocryphal Protoevangelium of James 22:3.

The interior of the lower church holds Italianate frescoes depicting Zachary at the altar of the Lord, the Visitation, and Elizabeth hiding her son during the Massacre of the Innocents.

=== Upper church ===
The walls of the upper church are decorated with frescoes. Those on the southern wall are depicting five episodes, from left (east) to right (west):

- the Council of Ephesus (431), which defined Mary as Theotokos or the Mother of God;
- Mary protecting Christians with her mantle, according to the oldest extant hymn to the Blessed Virgin Mary as Theotokos, the Sub tuum praesidium;
- the Wedding at Cana;
- the Battle of Lepanto (1571), in which a united Catholic fleet defeated an Ottoman fleet, a victory ascribed to the help of the Virgin Mary under the title Mary Help of Christians and celebrated by the Catholic Church with the feast of Our Lady of the Rosary;
- Duns Scotus, supported by the Franciscans, defending his thesis on the Immaculate Conception at the Sorbonne in Paris against the dissenting Dominicans.

Behind the altar, a fresco is showing Mary approaching through Judaea, with the Franciscan custos presenting her the model of the church and the Catholic patriarch of Jerusalem of the time in attendance.

Verses from the Magnificat are painted on the columns of the church. In the corners are the four cardinal virtues, and around the windows on the left side of the church are Christian writers (Fathers and Doctors of the Church) who have written about the Virgin Mary. The ceiling is painted in the Tuscan style of the 14th century.

== Gallery ==
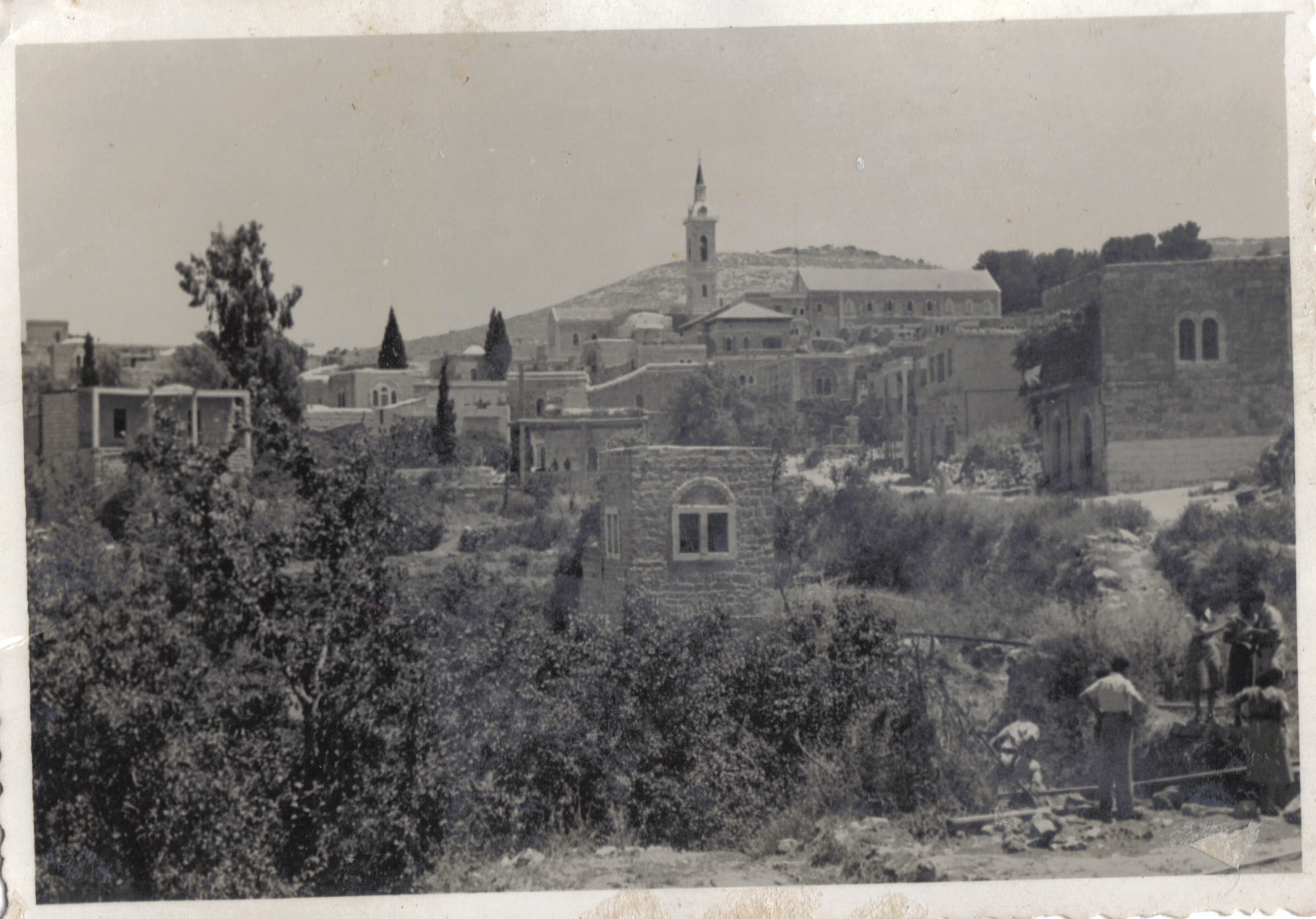
Ein Karem with the Church of the Visitation up on the hill, 1949

Exterior view circa 1900, before the upper church was rebuilt

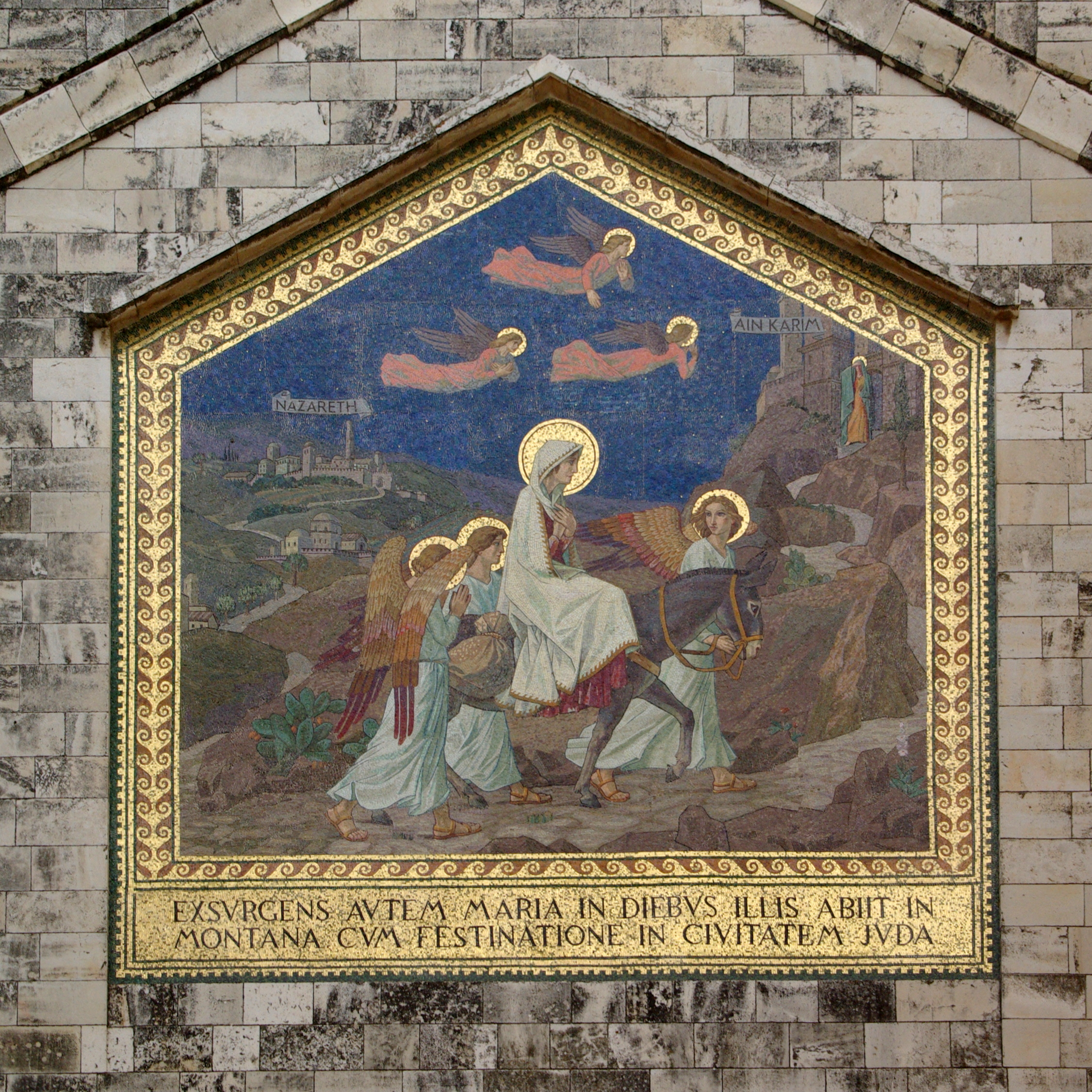
Mosaic on the west facade

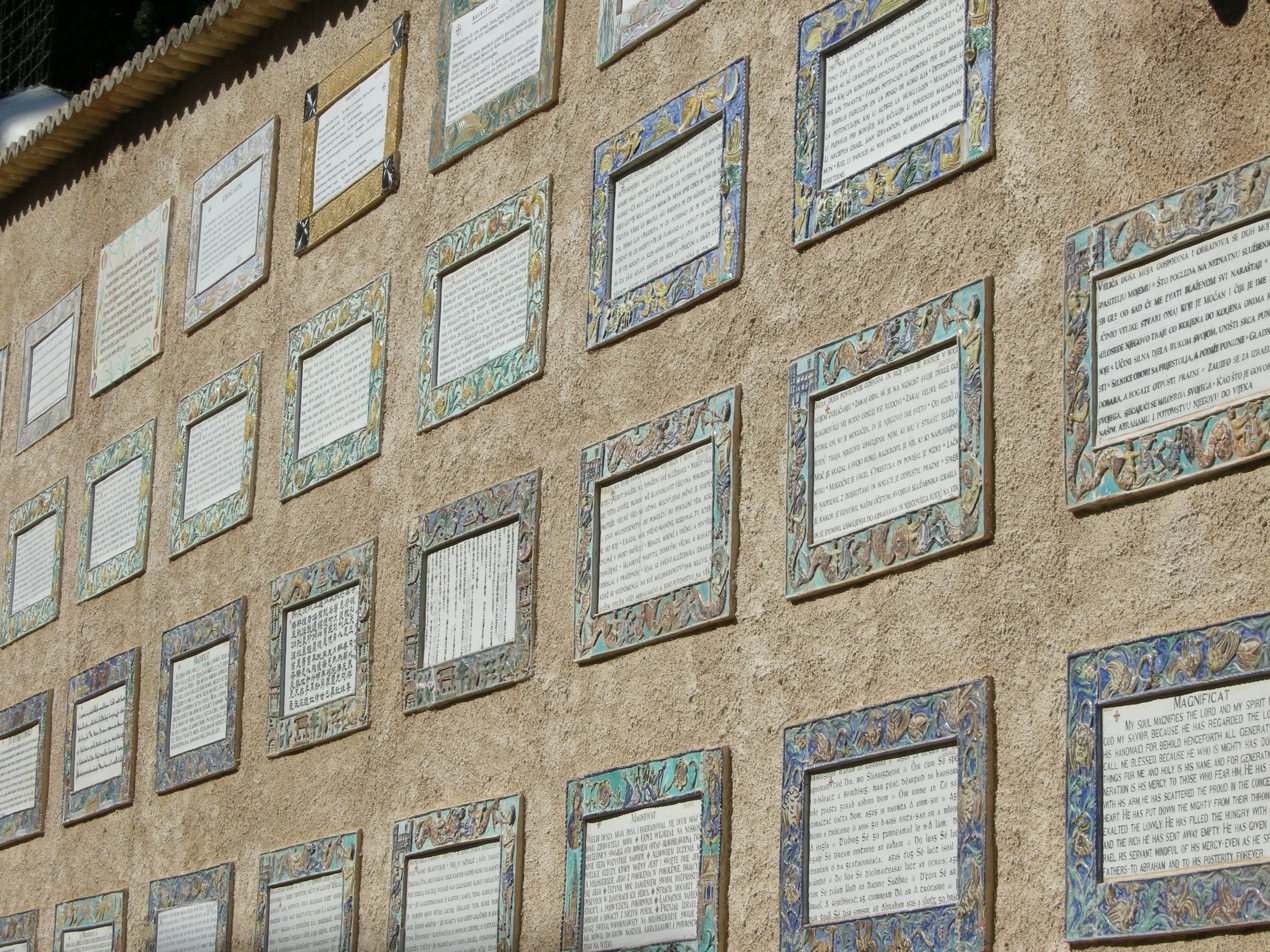
Courtyard, various translations of the "Magnificat"

Lower church, interior including grotto on the right

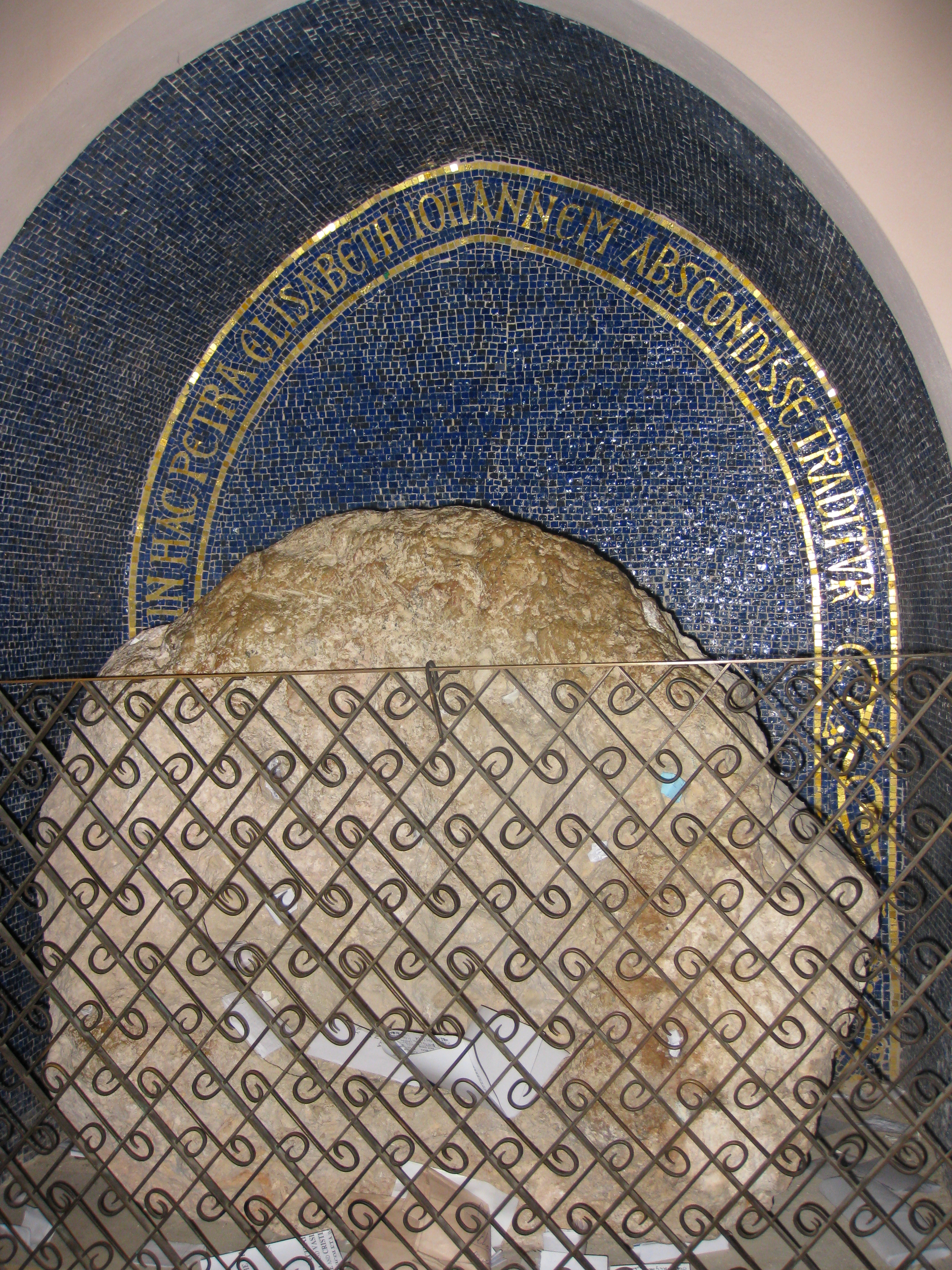
Lower church, rock which hid Elizabeth & John

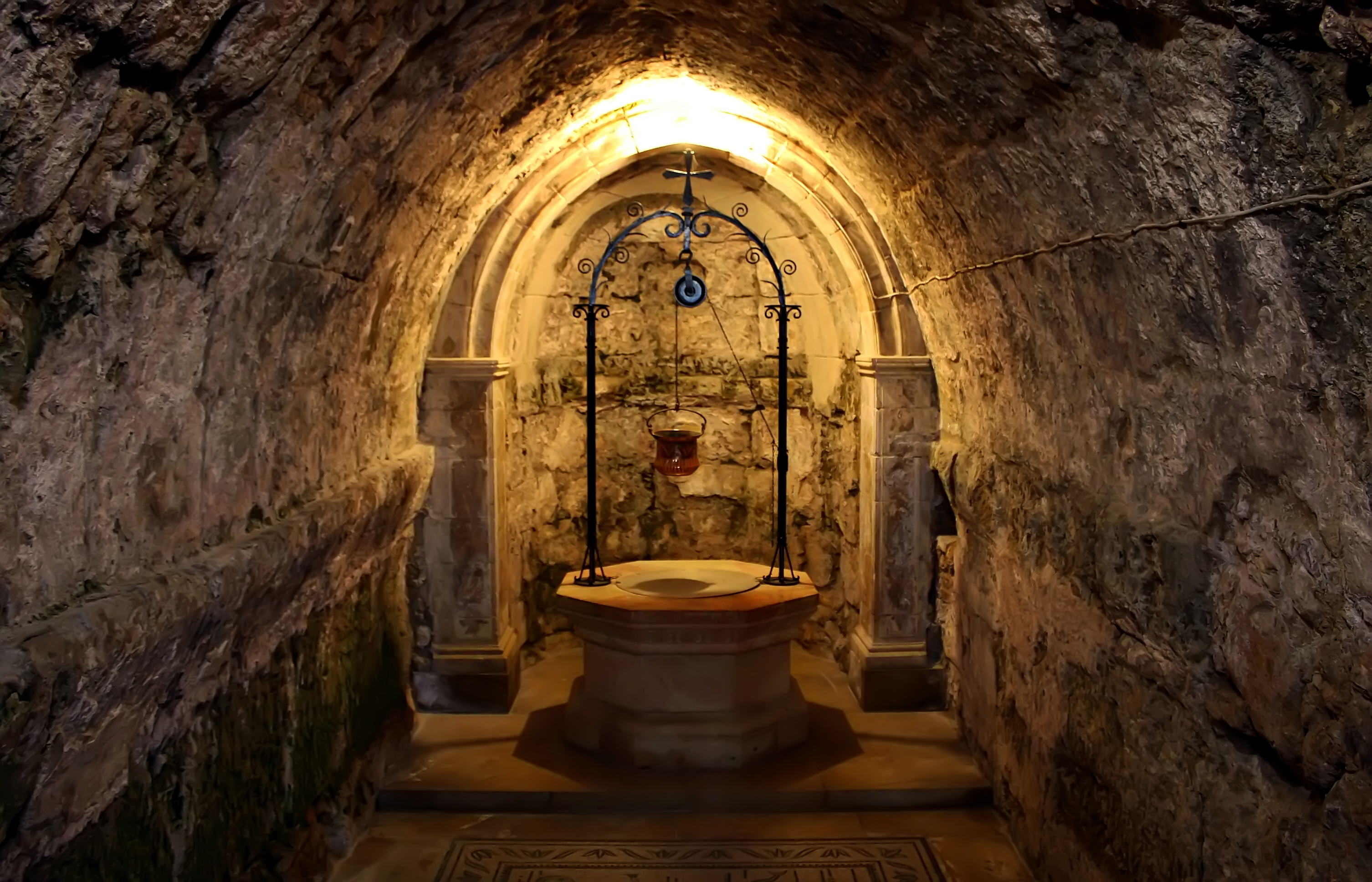
Lower church, the grotto and well

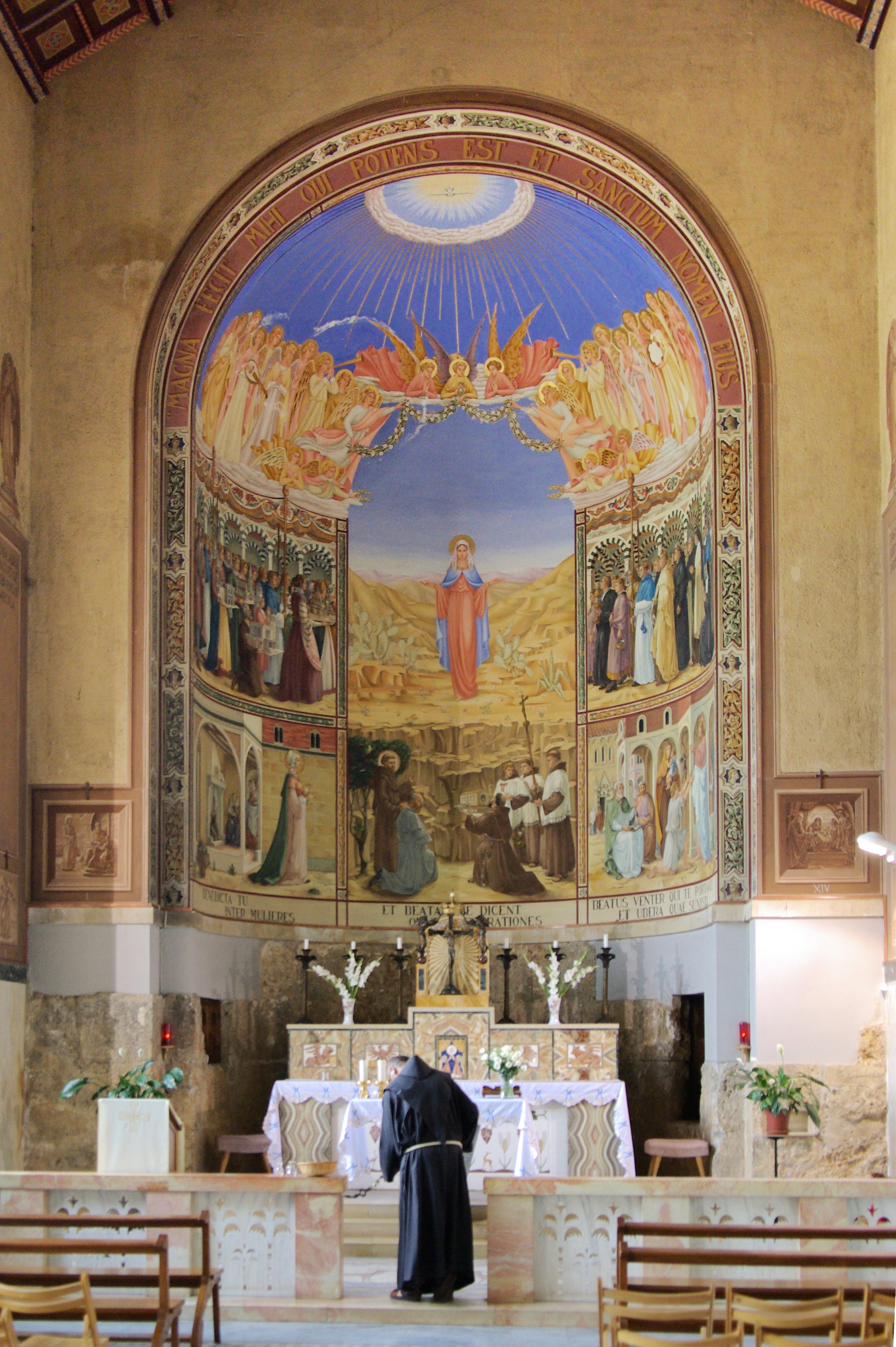
Upper church, the altar

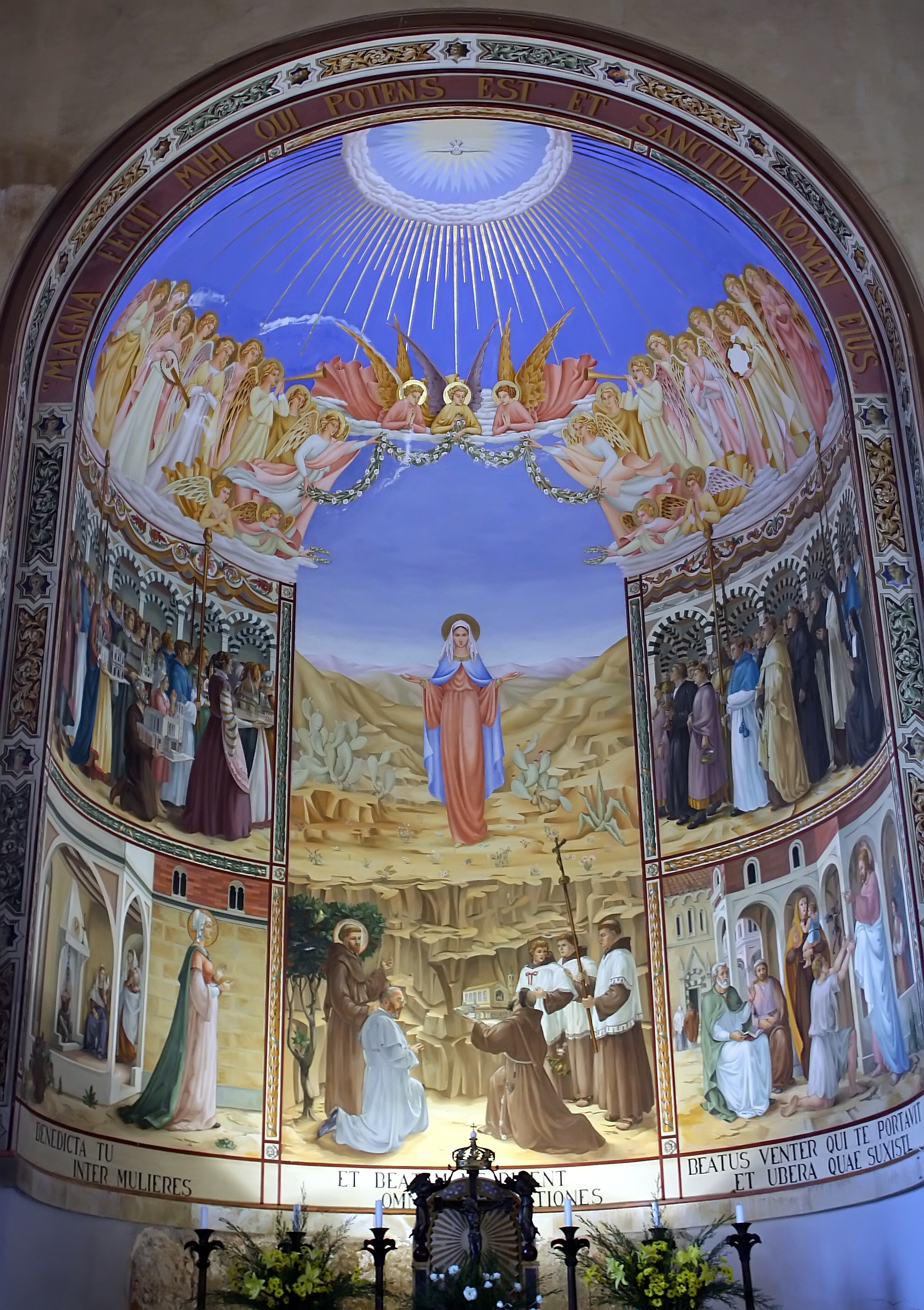
Upper church, art above the altar

== Bibliography ==
- Fabri, Felix (1896). Felix Fabri (circa 1480–1483 A.D.) vol I, part II. Palestine Pilgrims' Text Society.
- Finegan, Jack (2014). The Archeology of the New Testament: The Life of Jesus and the Beginning of the Early Church (revised ed.). Princeton University Press. p. 4. ISBN 9781400863181.
- Pringle, Denys (1993). The Churches of the Crusader Kingdom of Jerusalem: A-K (excluding Acre and Jerusalem). Vol. I. Cambridge University Press. ISBN 0-521-39036-2.
