= Chapel of Saint Vincent de Paul, Jerusalem =

St. Vincent de Paul Chapel
- מנזר סן ונסן דה פול
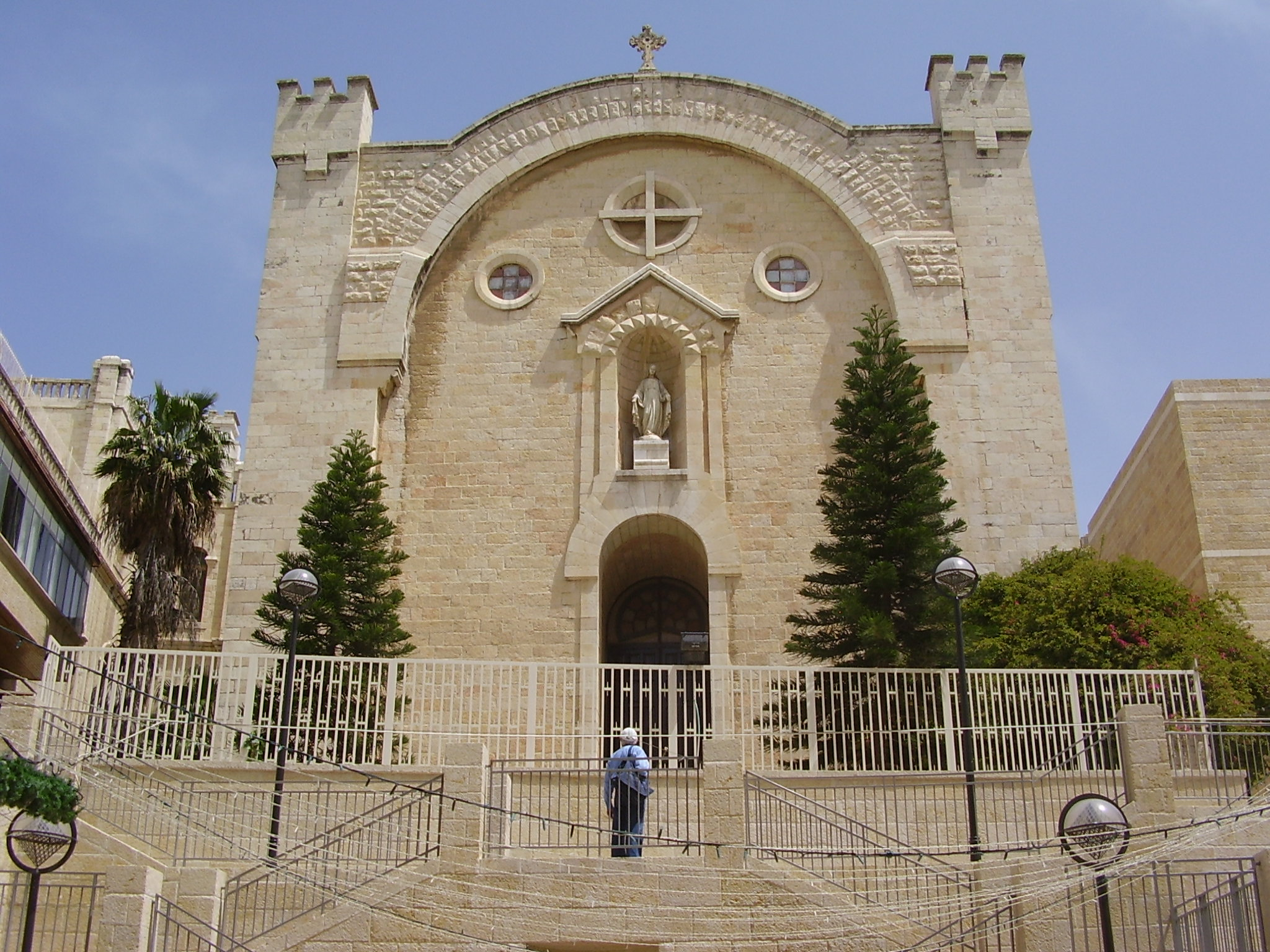
- St. Vincent de Paul Chapel
- 31.7783°N 35.2239°E
- Location: Jerusalem
- Denomination: Roman Catholic Church

The St. Vincent de Paul Chapel (Hebrew: מנזר סן ונסן דה פול) is a Catholic chapel that serves the Hospice of St. Vincent de Paul in Jerusalem. It is dedicated to the founder of the Daughters of Charity who also run a hospital and an adjoining nursery. This is one of the largest Catholic churches in the city. The sisters are present in the Holy Land since 1884.

The chapel was built in the Romanesque Revival style. The nave is delimited by Neo-Romanesque pillars from the side aisles.

== See also ==
- Roman Catholicism in Israel
- St. Vincent de Paul Church (disambiguation)

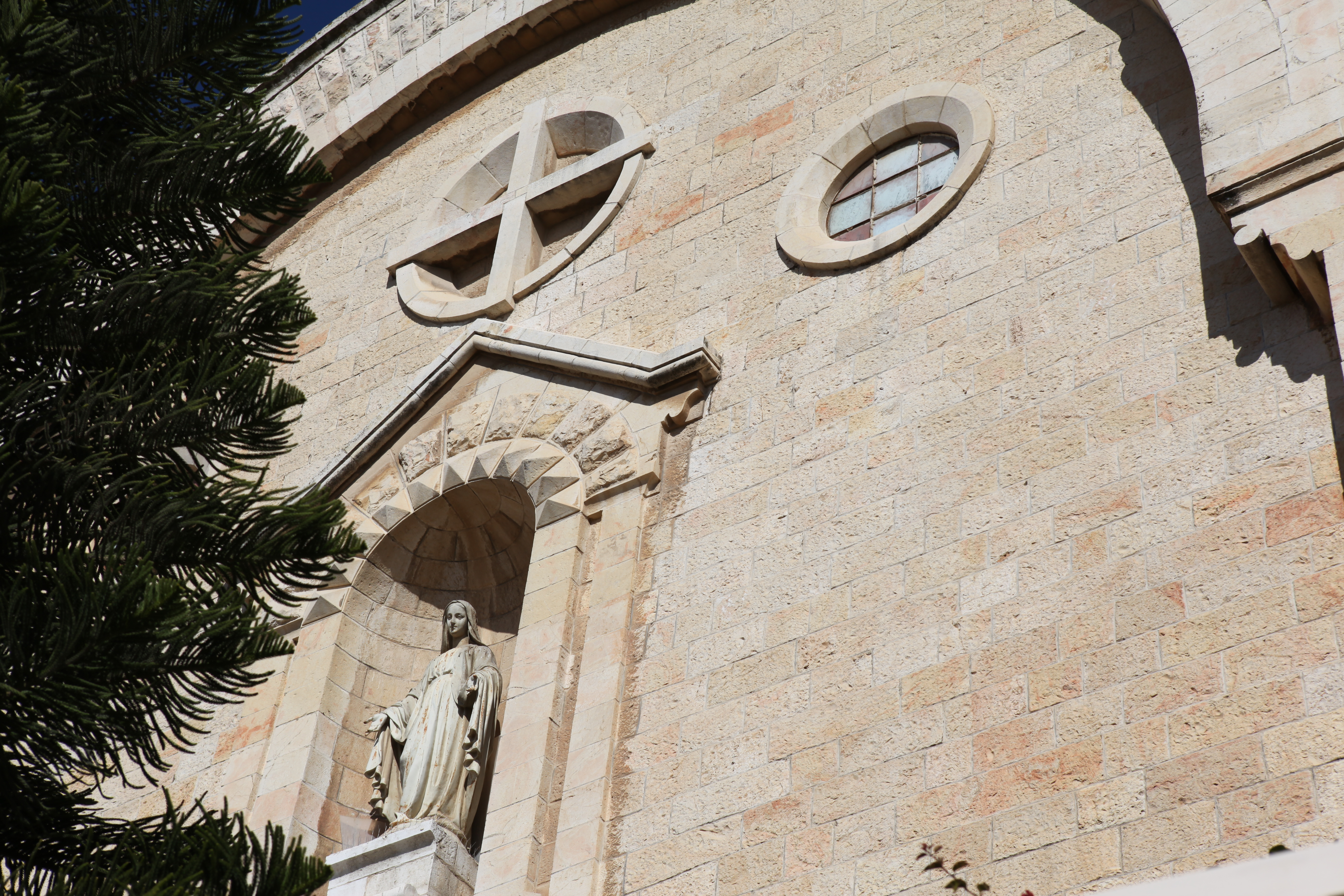
View of the facade of the temple
