= Martín Espada =

Puerto Rican poet (born 1957)

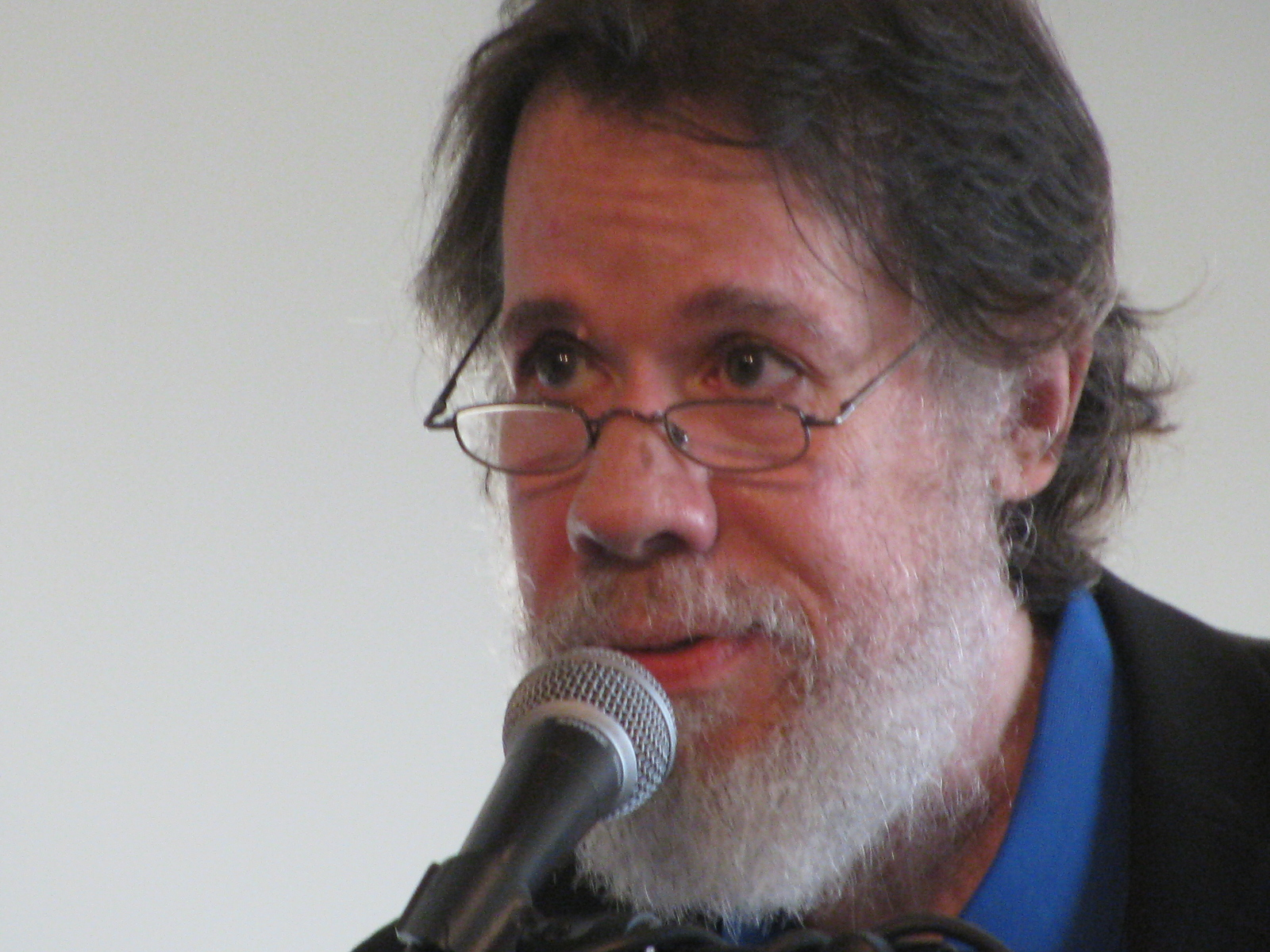
- Born: 7 August 1957 (age 69); New York City, U.S.
- Education: University of Wisconsin, Madison (BA); Northeastern University (JD)
- Occupations: Poet; professor; translator
- Writing career
- Notable work: Imagine the Angels of Bread
- Notable awards: National Book Award; American Book Award; PEN/Revson Fellowship; Paterson Poetry Prize

Martín Espada (born 1957) is a Puerto Rican-American poet, and a professor at the University of Massachusetts Amherst, where he teaches poetry. Puerto Rico has frequently been featured as a theme in his poems.

== Life and career ==
Espada was born in Brooklyn, New York. He was introduced to political activism at an early age by his father, Frank Espada, a leader in the Puerto Rican community and the civil rights movement. Espada received a B.A. in history from the University of Wisconsin–Madison and a J.D. from Northeastern University (Boston, Massachusetts). For many years, he worked as a tenant lawyer and a supervisor of a legal services program. In 1982, Espada published his first book of political poems, The Immigrant Iceboy's Bolero, featuring photography by his father. This was followed by Trumpets from the Islands of their Eviction (1987) and Rebellion is the Circle of a Lover's Hands. In 2001, he was named the first Poet Laureate of Northampton, Massachusetts. In 2018, Espada received the Ruth Lilly Poetry Prize, a lifetime achievement award given by the Poetry Foundation to a living U.S. poet that carries a $100,000 prize. Espada was the first Latino recipient of the honor.

About his first and subsequent visits to meet family in Puerto Rico, Espada said it was "absolutely transformative", an "absolute revelation", "a process of self-discovery", and that "going there affirms you have a history". His poem "Coca Cola and Coco Frio" is about that.

In 2009, Espada performed in The People Speak, a documentary feature film that uses dramatic and musical performances of the letters, diaries, and speeches of everyday Americans, based on historian Howard Zinn's A People's History of the United States.

In 2021, Espada won the National Book Award for Poetry for his poem "Floaters" about two migrants, Oscar and his daughter Valeria, who drowned crossing the Rio Grande at the U.S. Border.

Espada is a professor at the University of Massachusetts Amherst, and lives in Shelburne Falls, Massachusetts.

== Awards and honours ==
- Massachusetts Artists Foundation Fellowship in Poetry, 1984
- National Endowment for the Arts Creative Writing Fellowship, 1986
- PEN/Revson Foundation Fellowship in Poetry, 1989
- Paterson Poetry Prize, 1991
- National Endowment for the Arts Creative Writing Fellowship, 1992
- Massachusetts Cultural Council Artist Grant, 1996
- National Book Critics Circle Award Finalist, 1997
- Before Columbus Foundation American Book Award, 1997
- Gustavus Myers Center Outstanding Book Award, 1998
- Pushcart Prize, 1999
- Independent Publisher Book Award, 1999
- Poet Laureate of Northampton, Massachusetts, 2001
- Antonia Pantoja Award, 2003
- American Library Association Notable Book, 2004
- Robert Creeley Award, 2004
- Charity Randall Citation, 2005
- John Simon Guggenheim Memorial Foundation Fellowship, 2006
- Pulitzer Prize Finalist, 2007
- San Francisco Chronicle Best Books, 2007
- Library Journal Best Poetry Books, 2007
- Paterson Award for Sustained Literary Achievement, 2007
- Premio Fronterizo, 2007
- National Hispanic Cultural Center Literary Award, 2008
- USA Simon Fellowship, 2010
- Massachusetts Book Award, 2012
- Milt Kessler Poetry Book Award, 2012
- International Latino Book Award, 2012
- Walt Whitman Birthplace Poet in Residence, 2012
- Busboys and Poets Award, 2014
- Academy of American Poets Fellowship, 2018
- Ruth Lilly Poetry Prize, 2018
- National Book Award for Poetry, 2021

== Works ==
=== Books of poetry ===
- The Immigrant Iceboy's Bolero, Waterfront Press, 1982, ISBN 9780943862330
- Trumpets from the Islands of Their Eviction, Bilingual Press, 1987, ISBN 9780916950729
- Rebellion is the Circle of a Lover's Hands, Curbstone Press, 1990, ISBN 9780915306954
- City of Coughing and Dead Radiators, W.W. Norton, 1993, ISBN 9780393312171
- Imagine the Angels of Bread, Norton, 1996, ISBN 9780393039160
- A Mayan Astronomer in Hell's Kitchen, Norton, 2000, ISBN 9780393048889
- Alabanza: New and Selected Poems 1982-2002 (W.W. Norton, 2003 US, 2004 UK)
- The Republic of Poetry. W.W. Norton. 2006. ISBN 9780393069709.
- La República de la Poesía (Mago Editores, Chile, 2007)
- Crucifixion in the Plaza de Armas, Smokestack Books, 2008, ISBN 9780955402814
- La Tumba de Buenaventura Roig (Terranova Editores, Puerto Rico, 2008)
- Soldados en el Jardín (El Gaviero Ediciones, Spain, 2009)
- The Trouble Ball. W.W. Norton. 2011. ISBN 9780393080032. U.S.;, 2012, ISBN 9780393343564, UK
- Vivas to Those Who Have Failed. W.W. Norton. 2016. ISBN 9780393249033.
- Floaters : Poems, W.W.Norton, 2021, ISBN 9780393541038
- Jailbreak of Sparrows: Poems, Knopf, 2025, ISBN 9780593537121

=== Books of essays ===
- Zapata's Disciple (2nd ed.). Northwestern University Press. 2016. ISBN 9780810133853.
- Zapata's Disciple. South End Press. 1998. ISBN 9780896085893. "Martín Espada."
- Auf der Suche nach La Revolución (Agentur Machtwort, Germany, 2004)
- The Lover of a Subversive is Also a Subversive: Essays and Commentaries. University of Michigan Press. 2010. ISBN 9780472051472.

=== As editor ===
- Poetry Like Bread: Poets of the Political Imagination (Curbstone, 1994)
- El Coro: A Chorus of Latino and Latina Poetry. University of Massachusetts Press. 1997. ISBN 9781558491113. "Martín Espada."
- His Hands Were Gentle: Selected Lyrics of Víctor Jara (Smokestack, UK, 2012)
- What Saves Us: Poems of Empathy and Outrage in the Age of Trump (Northwestern University Press, Curbstone, 2019)

=== In anthology ===
- Ghost Fishing: An Eco-Justice Poetry Anthology, University of Georgia Press, 2018, ISBN 9780820353159
- Seeds of Fire: Contemporary Poetry from the Other U. S. A. Smokestack Books. ISBN 978-0955402821

== See also ==
- List of Puerto Rican writers
- List of Puerto Ricans
- Puerto Rican literature
- Latino poetry
- The Saint Vincent de Paul Food Pantry Stomp
