= St. Vincent de Paul School =

St. Vincent de Paul School may refer to:

- St. Vincent de Paul Elementary & Junior High, in Calgary, Alberta
- St. Vincent de Paul School (Newport, Kentucky), listed on the NRHP in Kentucky
- St. Vincent de Paul High School (Petersburg, Virginia)
