= St. Vincent's Church =

St. Vincent's Church may refer to:

== Denmark ==
- St. Vincent's Church, Helsingør

== Italy ==
- San Vincenzo, Modena

== Portugal ==
- Monastery of São Vicente de Fora, Lisbon
- St Vincent's Church, Braga, Braga
- Igreja de São Vicente de Sousa, Felgueiras Municipality

== Spain ==
- Church of San Vicente Mártir, Vitoria-Gasteiz

== England ==
- St Vincent's Church, Caythorpe, Lincolnshire, England
- St Vincent's Church, Crookes, South Yorkshire, England
- St Vincent's Church, Sheffield, South Yorkshire, England
- Church of St Vincent, Ashington, Somerset, England

== Poland ==
- Church of St. Vincent (Wrocław), Poland

== See also ==
- St. Vincent de Paul Church (disambiguation)
- St. Vincent Ferrer Catholic Church (disambiguation)
