= St. Vincent Ferrer Catholic Church =

St. Vincent Ferrer Catholic Church may refer to:

- St. Vincent Ferrer Catholic Church (Delray Beach, Florida)
- Church of St. Vincent Ferrer (New York)
- St. Vincent Ferrer Catholic Church, Menifee

== See also ==
- St. Vincent's Church (disambiguation)
