= Serbian Monastery of Holy Archangels, Jerusalem =

Coordinates: 31°46′44.5″N 35°13′41.7″E

Monastery of Holy Archangels
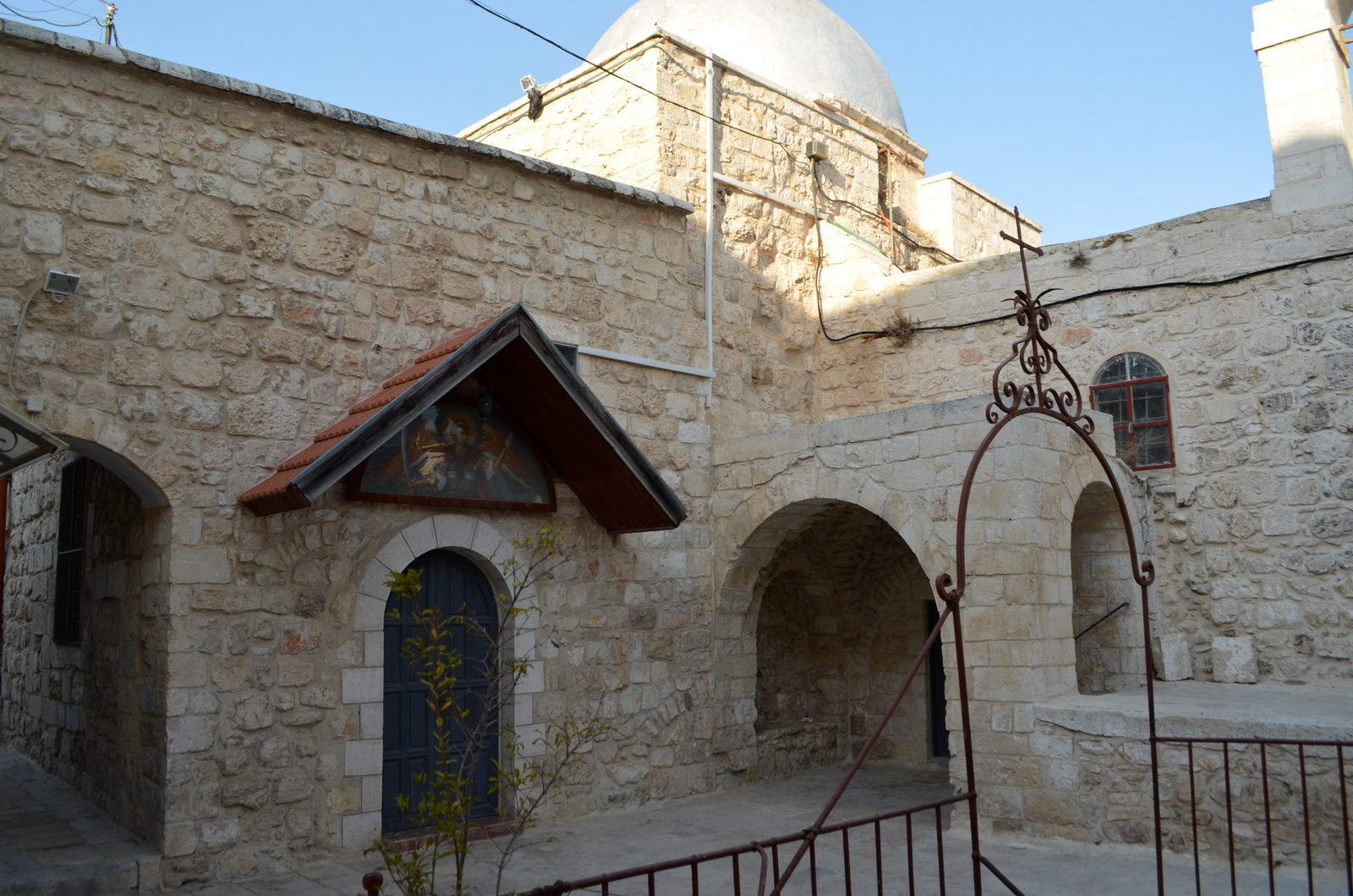
- View of the monastery
- Monastery of Holy Archangels
- Location: Christian Quarter, Old City of Jerusalem
- Denomination: Eastern Orthodox

History
- Status: Active
- Founder: Stefan Milutin
- Dedication: Holy Archangels
- Consecrated: after 1313

Architecture
- Style: Romanesque

Specifications
- Capacity: 200
- Materials: Stone

The Monastery of the Holy Archangels was founded and raised in 1312 in Jerusalem by Serbian King Milutin. It is located within the walls of the Old City of Jerusalem in the Holy Land, near the Church of the Holy Sepulchre (Church of the Resurrection of Christ) and the Greek Patriarchate. As of 2025, it is under the administration of the Greek Orthodox Patriarchate of Jerusalem.

The monastery is located on St. Francis street 9, in the immediate vicinity of the Church of the Holy Sepulchre (Church of the Resurrection of Christ) and the Greek Patriarchate, in the Christian part of the Old Town. In the library of the Jerusalem Patriarchate, which has recently been renovated, you can find a rich treasury of Serbian-Slavic manuscripts originating from the monastery of St. Archangels Michael and Gabriel.

The Holy Synod of the Serbian Orthodox Church sent a request to the Patriarchate of Jerusalem to return the monastery to the Serbian Orthodox Church.

== History ==
Serbian king Stefan Milutin had the monastery built for the needs of Serbian monks in Jerusalem following victory in the Battle of Gallipoli in Asia Minor. It was built on the ruins of an old Byzantine monastery that existed from the 4th to the 9th century. Milutin's chronicler, Archbishop Danilo, wrote in his chronicle that King Milutin sent elite warriors under the command of general Novak Grebostrek to his father-in-law, the Byzantine emperor Andronicus II Palaeologus to help fight the Ottoman Turks. Archbishop Danilo wrote: "Serbs cut their bodies like a reed." After this victory, King Milutin built the church of the Holy Archangels, and then he built lodgings, a small hospital, and an inn for all Serbian and Slavic monks and worshipers in the Holy Land. As per the Carian Charters of Serbian emperor Stefan Dušan (Karejske hrisovulje Stefana Dušana) from 1350, he decorated, fortified, and donated to the temple. In 1348 emperor Dušan had ordered for setting aside 500 perpers from the Serbian-Ragusan salt tax, 100 perpers from the Monastery of the Holy Saviour on Bojana, and then endowed (metochion) the Vranjina Monastery on Skadar Lake to the Jerusalem monastery. Also, Ragusa would undertake to endow the Church of the Holy Archangels in Jerusalem after receiving revenues of 2,000 perpers from the purchase of Ston on the Pelješac peninsula from Serbia. The monastery received an annual 100 perpers from Ston. The monastery of the Holy Archangels Michael and Gabriel was ruled by Serbian monks for about 300 years. After the Ottoman conquest of Serbia, the monastery in Jerusalem was helped by Russian monarchs and nobility.

Russian monks, who did not have their own monastery in Palestine, also began to gather there. Around 1400, the Russian archimandrite Gretenije states that the monastery stands on the spot where God destroyed the Assyrian army of 108,000 soldiers. Russian deacon Zosimus wrote 1419-1421 that the monastery belongs to the Serbian brotherhood and that the abbot is called Paisije. From the Chrysostom of Mara Branković, the wife of Sultan Murat II and daughter of Đurađ Branković, it can be seen that this monastery was deserted for a while in the second half of the 15th century, probably due to cholera. For a time, this monastery was a convent of the monastery of Saint Sabbas the Consecrated, which the sultan confirmed with a firman (decree) from 1537, as well as Sultan Mehmed III in 1601. Vasilije Posnyakov in 1558-1561 found in the monastery Serbian monks from the Sabbas monastery and mentioned that two monks went to Imperial Russia to ask the emperor for financial aid in the renovation of the monastery, and then to Constantinople to receive permission. At the beginning of the 17th century, Jan Kutvik estimated that there were more than 100 monks in the monastery. The Serbs then ran out of money, so they sold the monastery to Patriarch Theophanes III of Jerusalem (1608-1644) in 1623.

Russian archimandrite Porphyry of the Assumption, the head of the Russian mission (which also included Serb monks) in Jerusalem in the middle of the 19th century, stayed in the monastery of the Holy Archangels and claimed that it was "the most beautiful monastery of the Holy City", and registered many icons, 40 cells and that the monastery could accept about 200 devotees. The monastery housed a dining room, a hospital, a treasury, and a "wonderful library" with Greek, Latin, and Slavic manuscripts and printed books. Today, some of the Serbian-Slavic manuscripts are in the libraries of the Kyiv Theological Academy, Moscow, St. Petersburg, the Vatican, the Orthodox Monastery of St. Catherine, and the Orthodox Greek Patriarchate in Jerusalem, where the illuminated manuscript Adorer (1662) of "humble Gavril Tadić" was recently found. At a peace conference in Paris in 1920, a question was raised by Serbian delegates about the administration of Serbian shrines in Palestine.

The monastery celebrated the feast of the Holy Archangel as its glory, and that is the glory of Nemanjić. It was all made of hewn stone, as was the floor. There was next to the church, many buildings and cells of monks, a lot of water, and a large fence wall. In the 19th century, there were three honorary thrones in the temple: the middle one - dedicated to the Holy Archangels, the right one - to St. John Chrysostom, and the left one - to St. Nicholas.

Many church dignitaries, patriarchs, monks, pious citizens went on a pilgrimage to Jerusalem and the monastery of the Archangels Michael and Gabriel. Among them, in addition to Nemanjići and other Serbian rulers were Patriarch Arsenije III Crnojević (1683), who presented the monastery with the Gospel in the Old Slavonic language, Metropolitan Mihailo of Belgrade (1883), Patriarch German (1959), and Patriarch Pavle of Serbia (1994). Many Serbian dignitaries, monks, and pious citizens still visit the monastery today.

== See also ==
- Monasteries in Jerusalem

== Sources ==
- Byzantinoslavica. Academia. 1998. Archived from the original on 2022-03-18.
- Media related to Monastery of the Archangels (Christian Quarter, Jerusalem) at Wikimedia Commons
