= Frank Espada =

Puerto Rican photojournalist and activist

- Born: Francisco Luis Espada Roig; 21 December 1930; Utuado, Puerto Rico
- Died: 16 February 2014 (aged 83); New York City
- Education: City College of New York, New York Institute of Photography
- Occupation: photojournalist

Francisco Luis Espada Roig (21 December 1930 – 16 February 2014) was a Puerto Rican photojournalist, photographer, activist, educator, and community organizer. Frank Espada founded East New York Action in the early 1960s.

== Early life ==
Espada was born in 1930 in Utuado, Puerto Rico. His family migrated to New York City in 1939. After high school, he attended City College of New York but soon left without finishing his studies, instead joining the United States Air Force during the Korean War.

Espada married his wife, Marilyn, in 1952. Together they raised two boys and one girl: Jason, Lisa, and Martín Espada. Under the G.I. Bill, Espada was able to attend The New York Institute of Photography in New York City, where he studied documentary photography. He studied under and was mentored directly by W. Eugene Smith as well as Dave Heath. To support his family he worked as an electrical contractor for ten years.

== Political activism ==
Espada became involved in the civil rights movement prior to 1967 when he joined The City-Wide Puerto Rican Development Program, then under the direction of Manny Díaz. He worked as a community organizer in New York City's most vulnerable and impoverished areas. Espada organized strikes against rent increases, voter registration drives, sit-ins of welfare recipients and mothers, public school boycotts, marches for safer streets and civil and political rights.

In 1979, Espada was awarded a grant from the National Endowment for the Humanities which allowed him to focus on documenting the struggle of Puerto Rican communities in the US. Espada had been active and involved with the National Welfare Rights Organization, the National Latino Media Coalition, the National Congress for Puerto Rican Rights, the National Hispanic Manpower Association, and the National Association of Puerto Rican Drug Abuse Programs. In 1985, he moved his family to San Francisco.

== Photography ==
Espada was primarily known as a documentary photographer, and especially for his book and his documentary photography project entitled The Puerto Rican Diaspora: Themes in the Survival of a People in which he showcased his photography circa early-1960s to mid-1980s.

Espada is known for his work in photography's physical as well as its digital darkrooms. He became a teacher of photography at the University of California, Berkeley. He also taught photography and darkroom techniques at the Academy of Art University and the San Francisco Art Institute.

On the 109th Anniversary of the US Invasion of Puerto Rico, Espada with his then grown son, poet University of Massachusetts Amherst professor Martín Espada, appeared on a segment of Democracy Now!, a daily, independent, global news hour with Amy Goodman and Juan Gonzalez.

Working with Youth Environment Study (YES) founded by Harvey Feldman, Espada photographed and documented the devastating effect HIV/AIDS had wrought on the often-neglected and underserved population of people who abused drugs. He also photographed the physical beauty that surrounded him throughout the San Francisco Bay Area. Much of Espada's work, including some of his photographs and partial papers from 1946 to 2010, are now housed by the Duke University Libraries in their Rubenstein Library. The Library of Congress acquired an 83-print portfolio, and in 2010 Duke University Libraries acquired a selection of Espada's work, including over 200 finished prints, a portion of his papers, and material related to the Diaspora project. In 2017, the Smithsonian Institution acquired Espada's Diaspora collection.

Espada's work was included in the 2025 exhibition Photography and the Black Arts Movement, 1955–1985 at the National Gallery of Art.

== Works ==
- Frank Espada (1 January 2006). The Puerto Rican Diaspora: Themes in the Survival of a People. Frank Espada. pp. 5–. ISBN 978-0-9791247-1-6.
