= St. Vincent de Paul Church =

St. Vincent de Paul Church or St. Vincent de Paul Roman Catholic Church may refer to:

== Canada ==
- St. Vincent de Paul Roman Catholic Church (Toronto)

== France ==
- Saint-Vincent-de-Paul, Marseille
- Saint-Vincent-de-Paul, Paris
- Saint Vincent de Paul Chapel, Paris

== India ==
- St Vincent De Paul Church, Katapady

== Poland ==
- Saint Vincent de Paul Basilica, Bydgoszcz

== Tunisia ==
- Cathedral of Saint Vincent de Paul, Tunis

== United Kingdom ==
- Church of St Vincent de Paul, Liverpool
- Church of St Vincent de Paul and associated school, Newland, Kingston upon Hull

== United States ==
Alphabetical by state, then city

- St. Vincent de Paul Catholic Church (Mobile, Alabama)
- St. Vincent de Paul Church (Los Angeles), California
- St. Vincent de Paul Church, San Francisco, California
- St. Vincent de Paul Church (Chicago), Illinois
- St. Vincent de Paul Catholic Church (Louisville, Kentucky)
- St. Vincent De Paul Roman Catholic Church (New Orleans, Louisiana)
- St. Vincent de Paul Church (Baltimore, Maryland)
- St. Vincent de Paul Church (Pontiac, Michigan)
- St. Vincent De Paul Catholic Church (Cape Girardeau, Missouri)
- St. Vincent de Paul Catholic Church (Perryville, Missouri)
- St. Vincent de Paul Catholic Church (Bayonne, New Jersey)
- Cathedral of St Vincent de Paul (Malankara Catholic), Elmont, New York
- St. Vincent de Paul Church (Manhattan), New York
- St. Vincent de Paul Catholic Church (Newport News, Virginia)
- St. Vincent de Paul Church (Milwaukee), Wisconsin

== See also ==
- St. Vincent's Church (disambiguation)
- Saint-Vincent-de-Paul (disambiguation)
