= Church of Saint John the Baptist, Ein Karem =

Roman Catholic church in Jerusalem

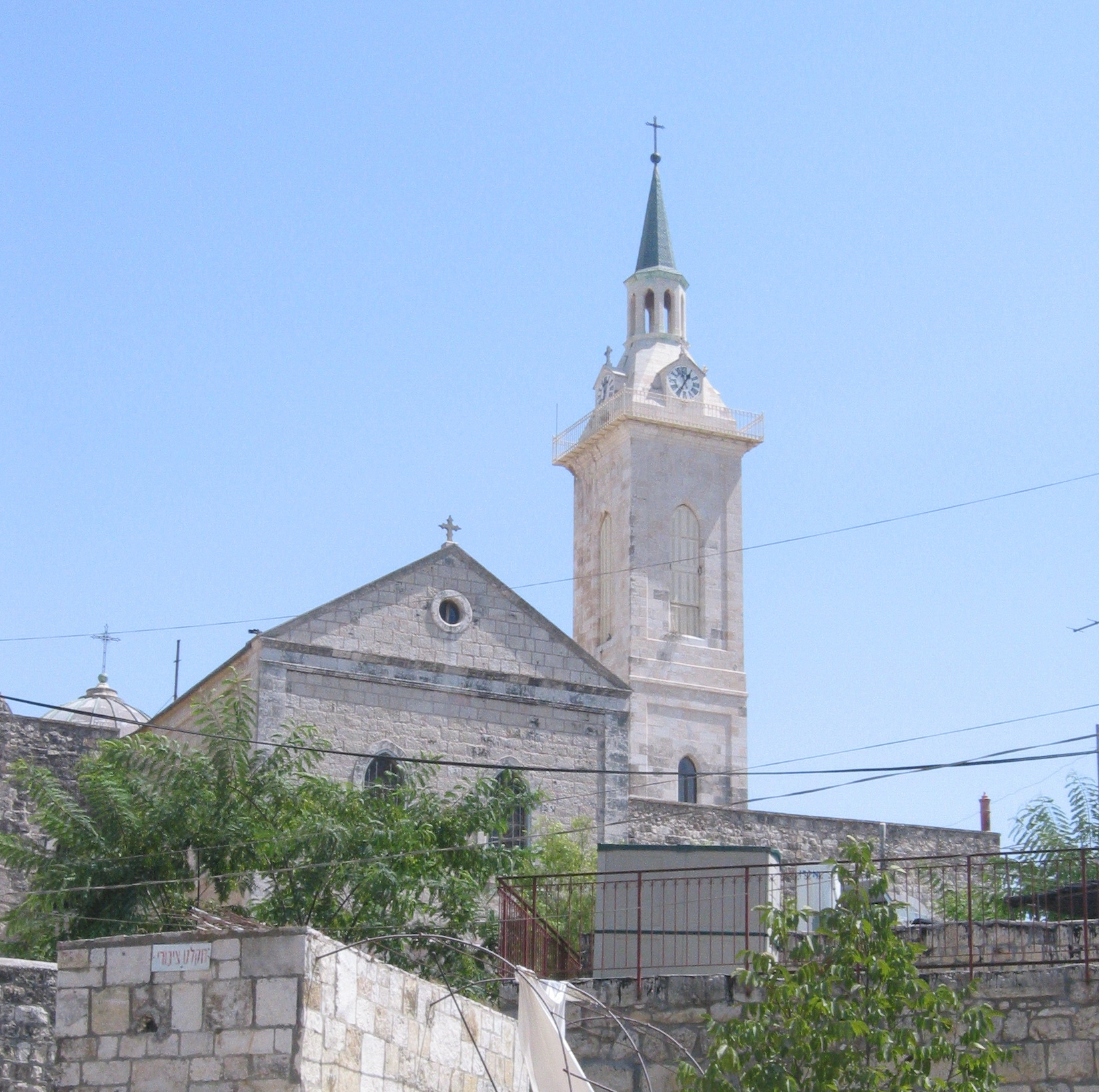
- Exterior view

Religion
- Affiliation: Roman Catholic
- Leadership: Franciscans

Location
- Location: Ein Karem, Jerusalem
- Interactive map of Church of Saint John the Baptist, Ein Karem
- Palestine grid: 1655/1307
- Coordinates: 31°46′05″N 35°09′47″E

Architecture
- Completed: Early Byzantine period: probable predecessor; 11th-12th centuries: most of current structure; 17th century: Franciscans rebuild; 19th century: Spanish redecoration campaign; porch
- Dome: 1

The Church of Saint John the Baptist is a Catholic church in Ein Karem, Jerusalem, that belongs to the Franciscan order. It was built at the site where Saint John the Baptist is believed to have been born.

In 1941–42, Franciscan archaeologists excavated the area west of the church and monastery. Here they discovered habitation remains from the Early Roman period, the presumed lifetime of John and his parents, Zacharia and Elizabeth, as well as two small Christian chapels and wine presses from the Byzantine period. The community living here has been dated by the archaeological findings back to the Roman, Byzantine and Early Muslim periods.

F. M. Abel assessed in 1938 that most of the current church structure probably dates back to the 11th century, with the lower courses possibly dating to the Byzantine period (4th-7th century).

== History ==
In 1941-42 the Franciscans excavated the area west of the church and monastery. Here they found Late Roman rock-cut chambers and graves, along with two small Byzantine chapels and wine presses. The community living here has been dated by the archaeological findings back to the Roman, Byzantine and Early Muslim periods.

French archaeologist Abel (1878–1953) positioned that most of the current church probably dates back to the 11th century during the Early Muslim period, with the lower courses possibly dating to the Byzantine period (4th-7th century).

=== Late Roman period ===
The digs west of the main buildings brought to light graves and rock-cut chambers. The southern rock-cut chamber contained ceramic datable to a period stretching from approximately the first century BC to 70 AD, an interval that includes the presumed lifetime of Zechariah, Elizabeth and John.

=== Byzantine period ===
The lower courses of the current church possibly date to the Byzantine period (4th-7th century). In the area excavated to the west of the monastery and church, the two Christian chapels with mosaic tiling as well as the wine presses belong to this same period.

=== Early Muslim period ===
According to Jack Finegan, a church at this site is mentioned in the Book of the Demonstration, attributed to Eutychius of Alexandria (940): "The church of Bayt Zakariya in the district of Aelia bears witness to the visit of Mary to her kinswoman Elizabeth."

Abel assumed in 1938 that most of the current church probably dates back to the 11th century, these Abbasid-period walls possibly standing on a few courses surviving from the Byzantine period.

=== Crusader period ===
A Russian pilgrim known as Abbot Daniel visited the village in 1106 and described here two churches. In the one identified by him as "the house of Zechariah .... where the holy Virgin came to greet Elizabeth", he mentions, on the left side, a "small cavern, in which John the Forerunner was born." The grotto seen in the current church at the front of the left aisle must be the same one mentioned by Daniel.

In 1113 there ia a mention of the Church of St. John, or of the Magnificat, in Ein Karem.

=== Mamluk period ===
In 1480, Felix Fabri reported it as tall, vaulted, and still painted, but turned into a stable for animals.

=== Ottoman period ===
==== 17th century ====
The 11th-12th-century church built above the traditional birth cave of St John, relatively well preserved at the beginning of the 17th but starting to collapse later during that century, was purchased by Franciscan custos, Father Thomas of Novara in 1621. The Muslim inhabitants forced the Catholics to abandon the site a few times during the 17th century and used the grotto and buildings as stables, even after the sultan issued a firman confirming Franciscan property over it in 1672, obtained through the influence of the Marquis de Nointel, the French Ambassador to the Ottoman Empire. Only in 1693 did the Franciscans return for good, rebuilt, and fortified the site.

In 1697, Henry Maundrell noted that: "The Convent of St John has been within these four years rebuilt from the ground. It is at present a large square building, uniform and neat all over; but that which is most eminently beautiful in it is its Church. It consists of three Isles, and has in the middle a handsome Cupola, under which is a pavement of mosaic, equal to, if not exceeding the finest works of the Ancients in that kind. At the upper end of the North Isle, you go down seven Marble steps, to a very splendid Altar, erected over the very place where they say the holy Baptist was Born. Here are Artificers still employed, in adding farther beauty and ornament to this Convent."

==== 19th century ====
James Silk Buckingham visited in the early 1800s, and found the convent "appeared to be superior in comfort and arrangement to that of Jerusalem, and equal to that of Nazareth. The church is one of the most simply beautiful throughout the Holy Land. As the friars are all Spaniards, it partakes more of the style of that nation than any other, in its ornaments."

In 1883, the PEF's Survey of Western Palestine (SWP) noted: "The Church of the Baptist, in the village itself, is of Crusading origin; but the interior has been covered with encaustic tiles, and none of the older work is recognizable. The dome rises from four heavy piers; the grotto north of the high altar (at the east end of the church), is reached by seven steps; it is said to be the birthplace of St. John. A bad copy of a Murillo is hung on the north side of the church, and much prized by the monks, who are chiefly Spaniards".

=== British Mandate period ===
In 1941-42 the Franciscans excavated the area west of the church and monastery.

== Present church plan ==
Floor plan of the Church of Saint John the Baptist with colour code by historical periods

Floor plan and legend:

- 1 (brown): Cave of John the Baptist's birth
- 2 (yellow): Crusader church (11th-12th century), representing the base of the current church
- 3 (red): Byzantine-period chapel with tombs and mosaic inscription mentioning martyrs (5th century)
- 4 (red): Byzantine-period chapel (7th century)
- 5 (brown): Jewish ritual bath or mikveh (1st century)
- 6 & 7 (green): Crusader halls (12th century)

== Gallery ==
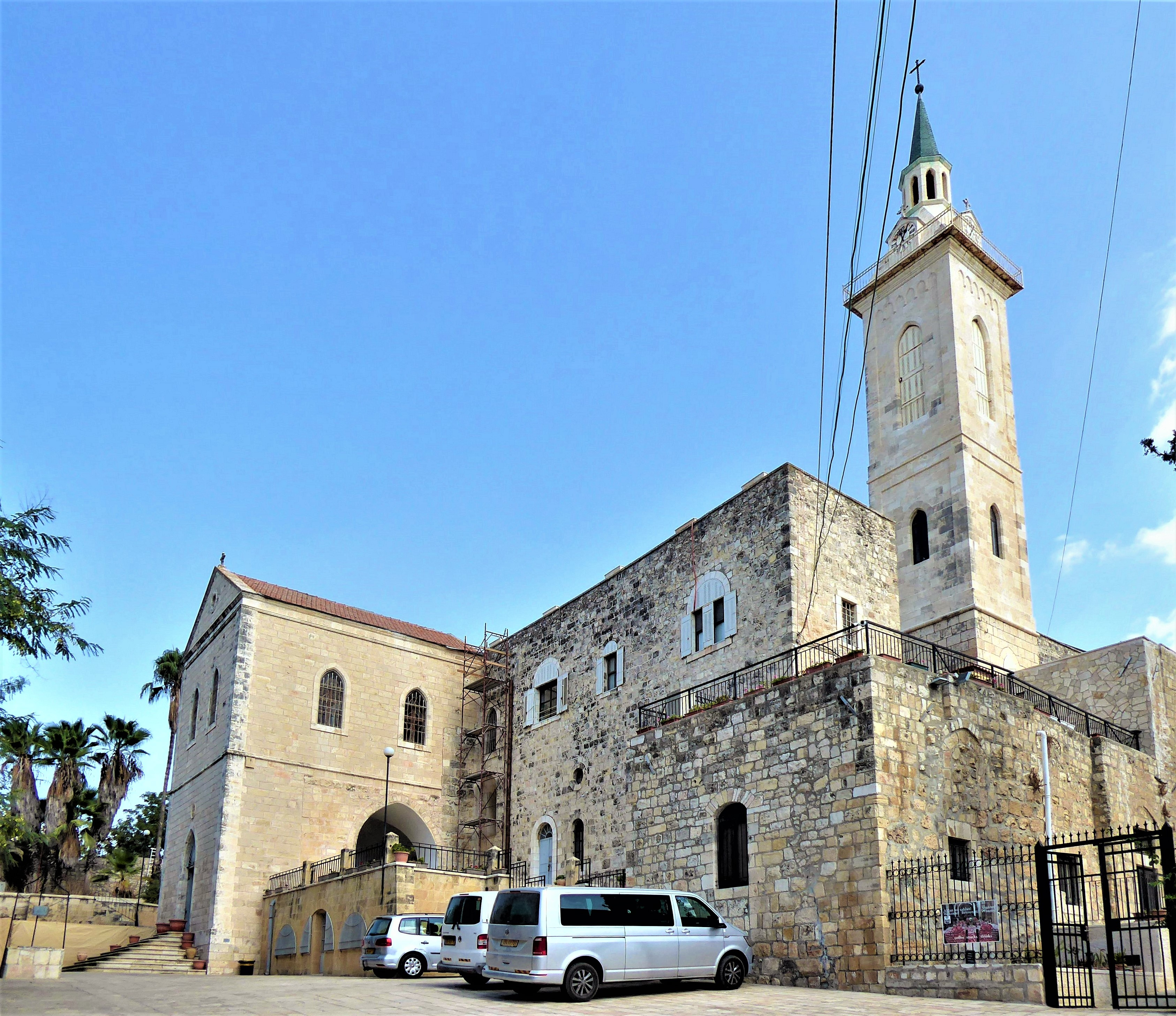
Exterior

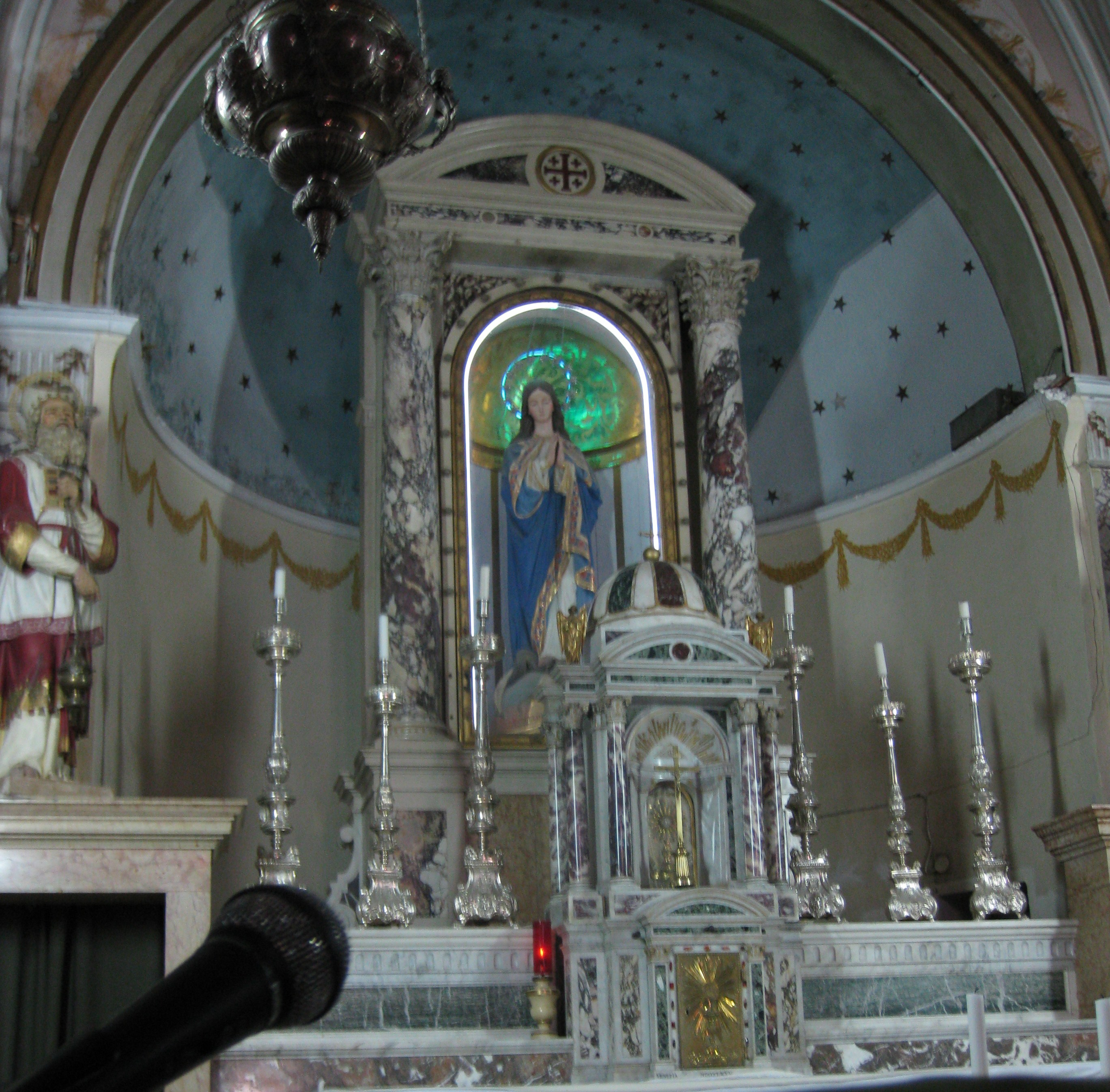
The altar in the church

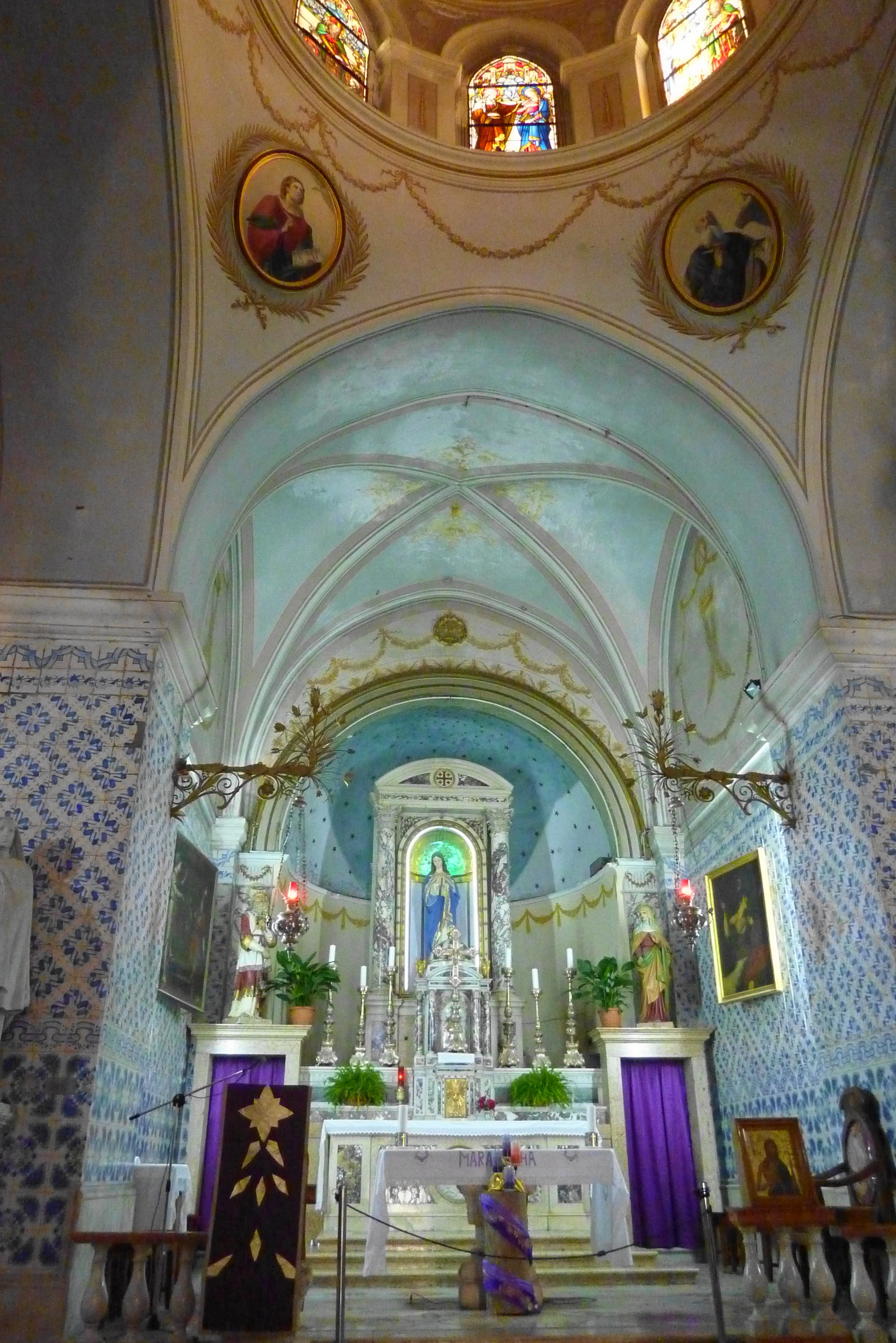
The altar and cupola in the church

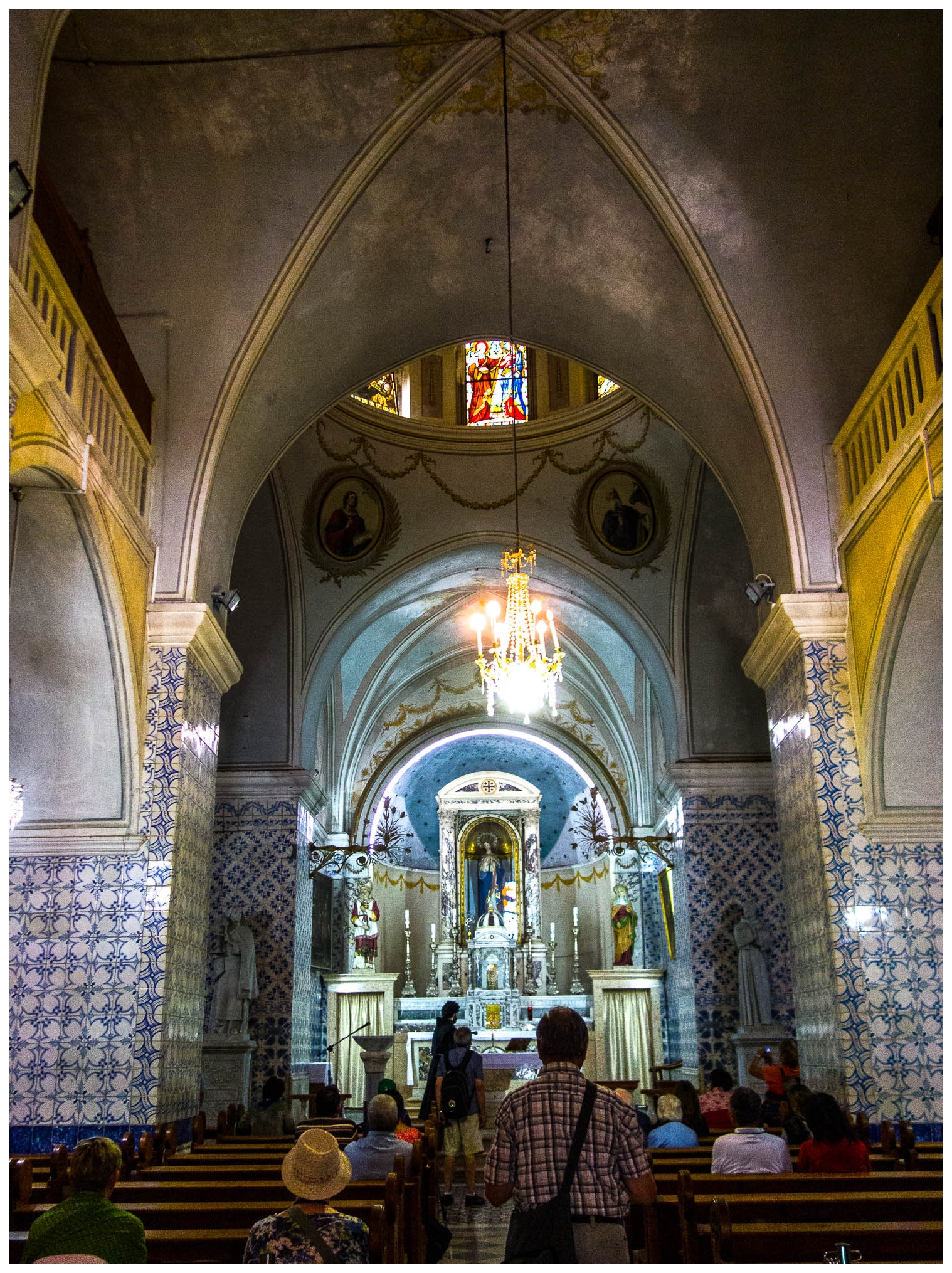
The altar and cupola in the church

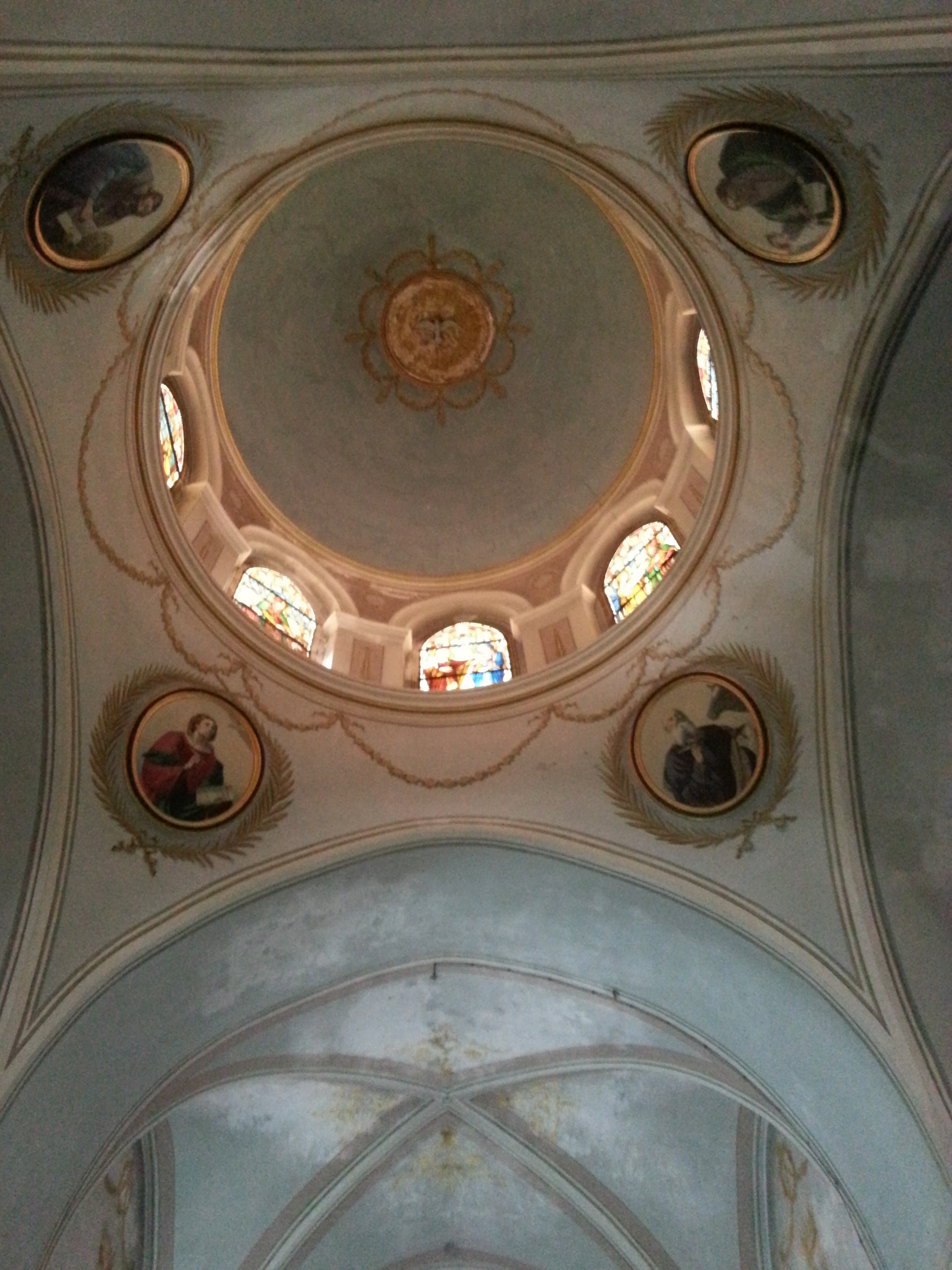
The cupola in the church

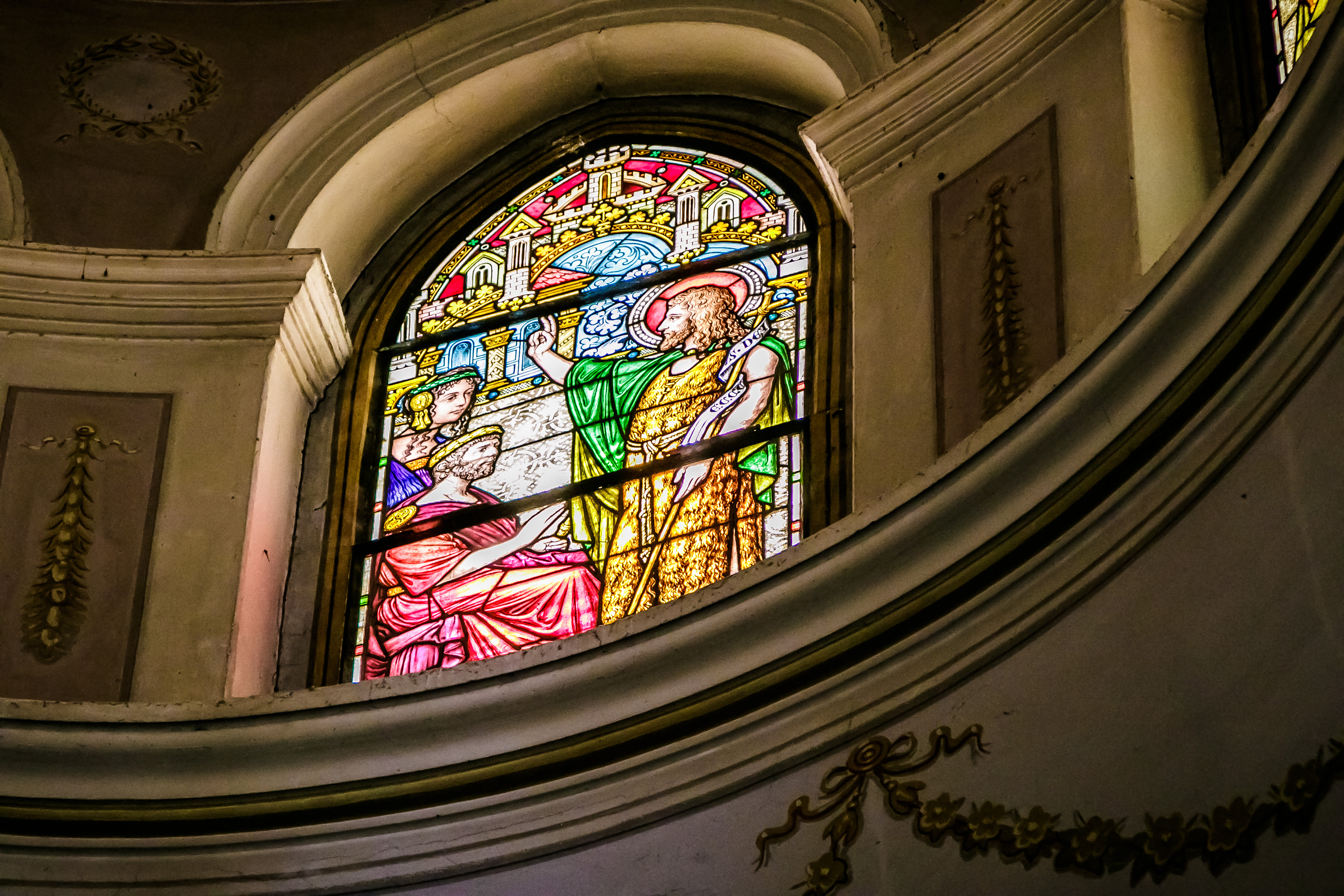
Part of the cupola in the church

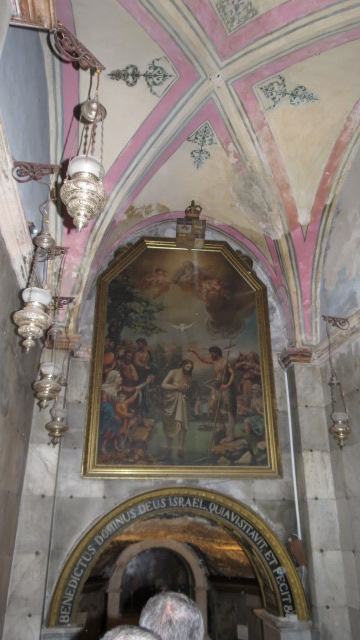
Entrance of the cave of John the Baptist's birth

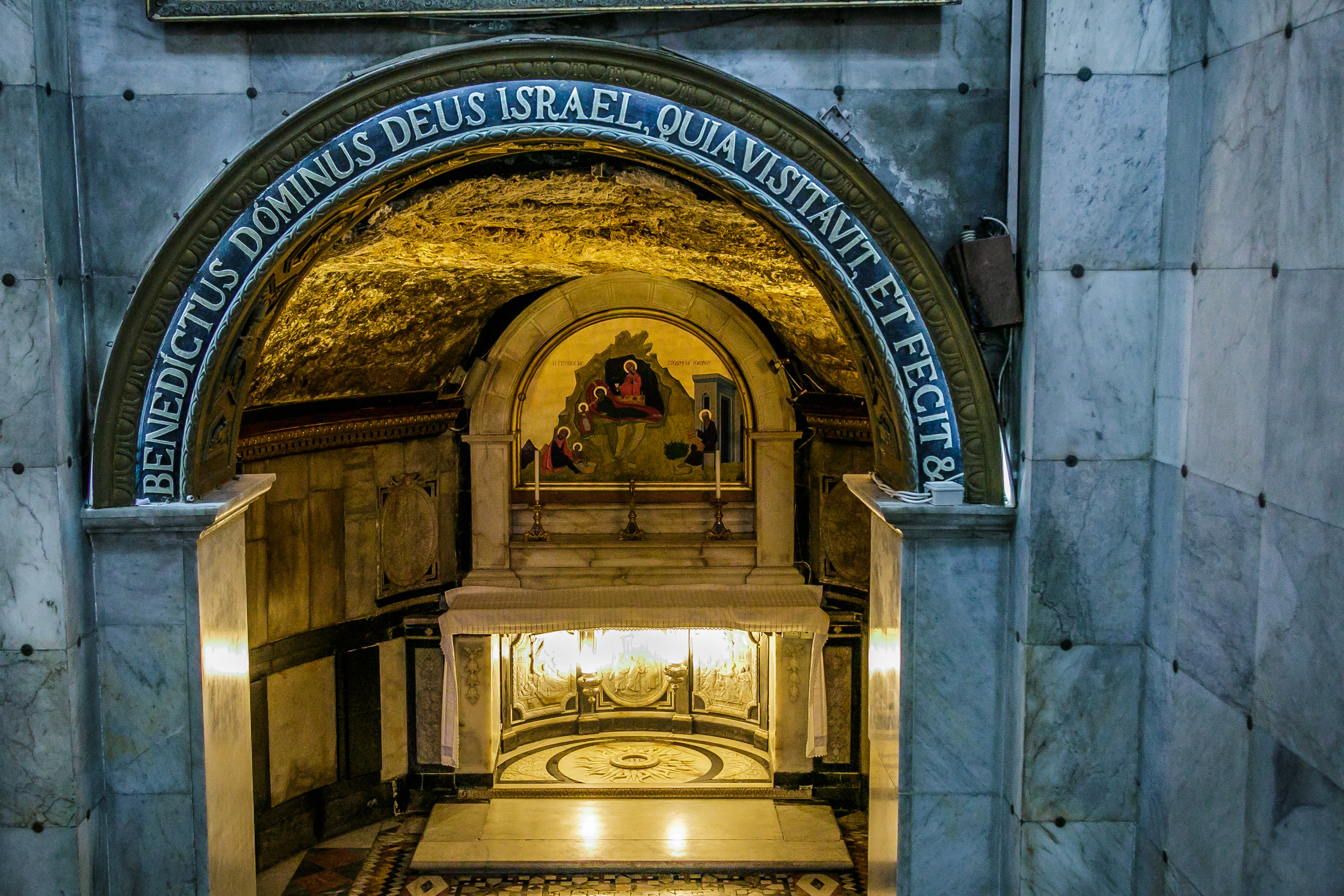
Entrance of the cave of John the Baptist's birth

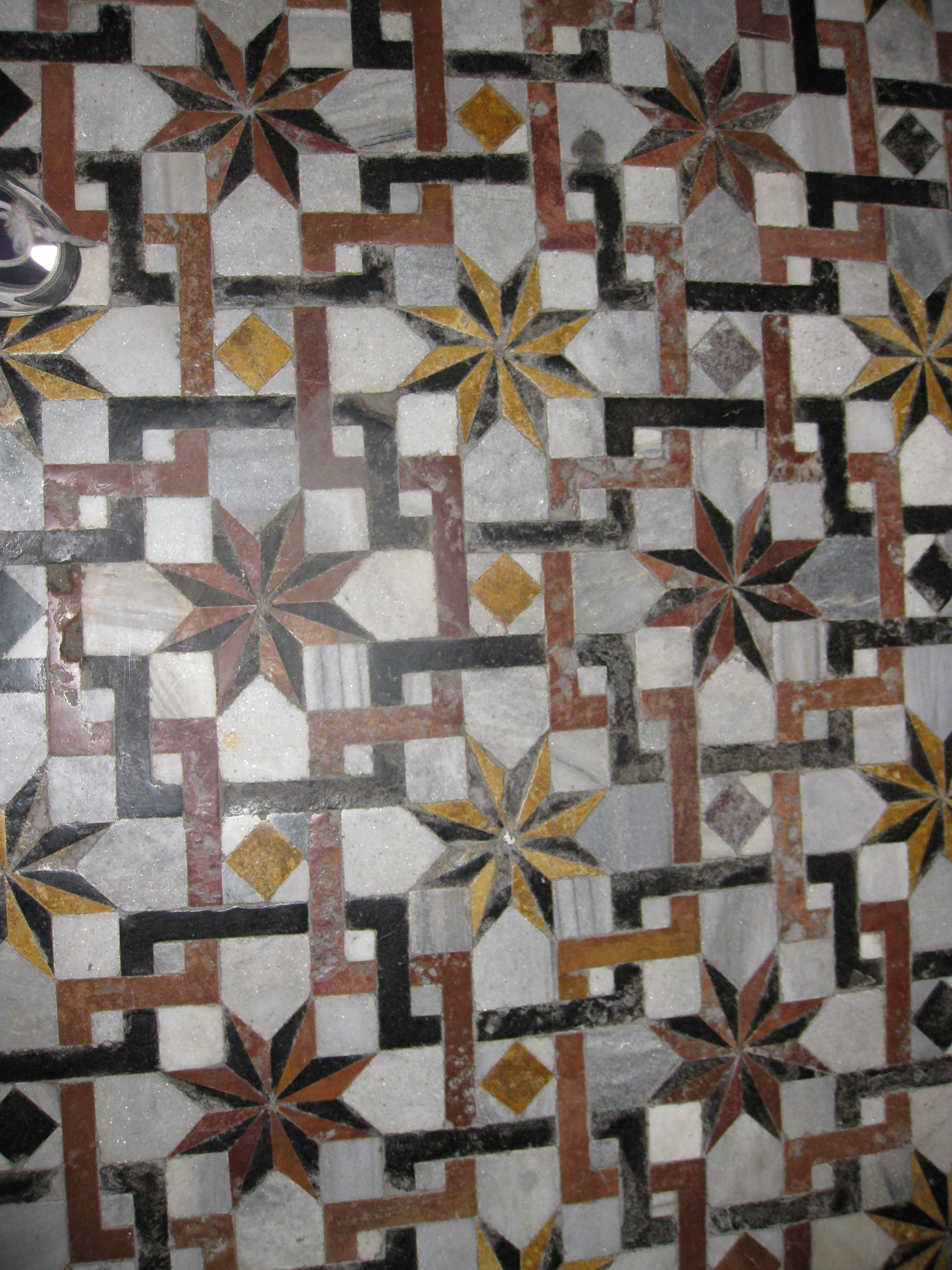
The floor tiles in the cave

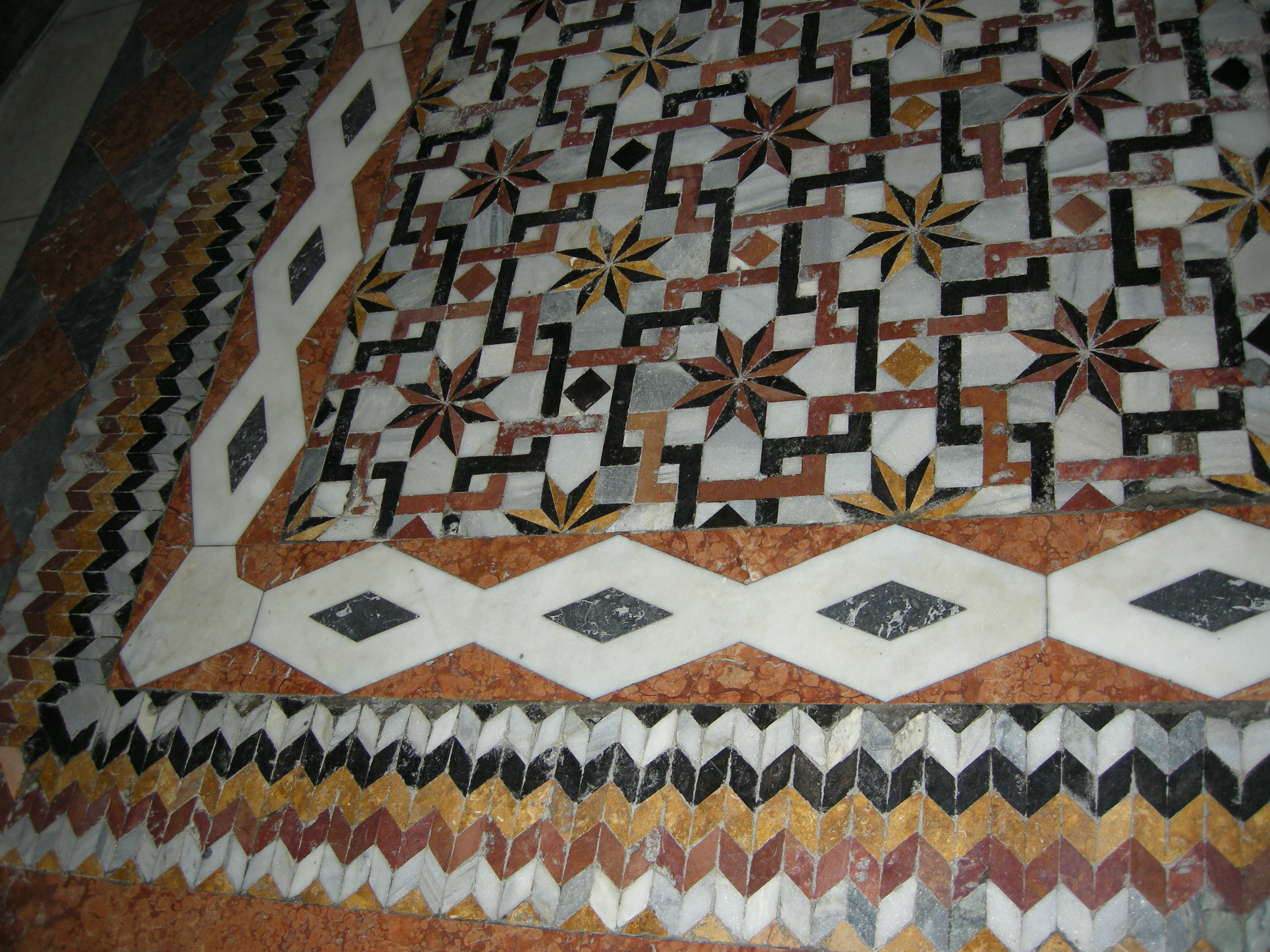
The floor tiles in the cave

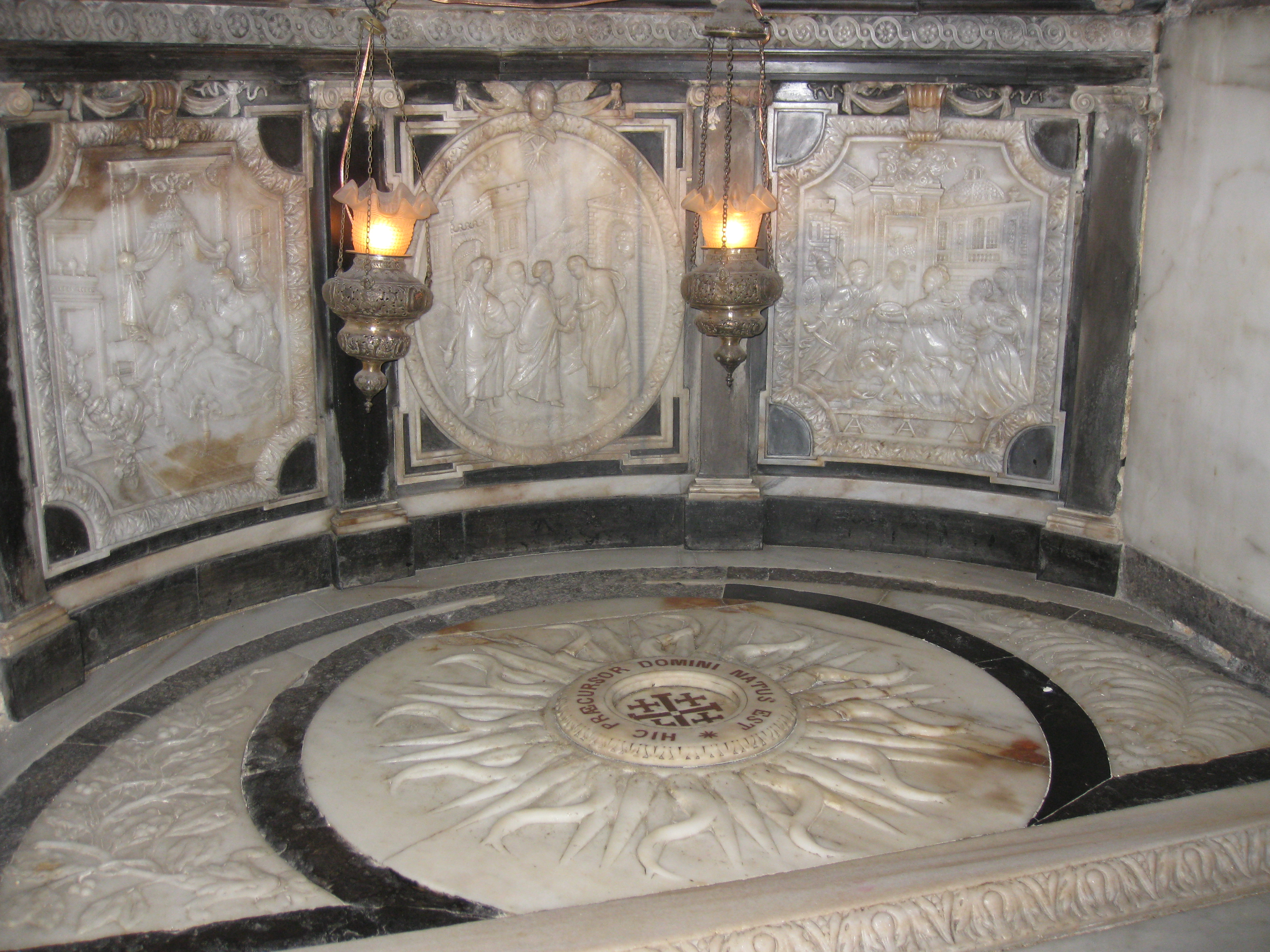
Cave of John the Baptist's birth

== See also ==
- Church of the Visitation

== Bibliography ==
- Buckingham, J.S. (1821). Travels in Palestine Through the Countries of Bashan and Gilead, East of the River Jordan, Including a Visit to the Cities of Geraza and Gamala in the Decapolis. London: Longman.
- Conder, C.R.; Kitchener, H.H. (1883). The Survey of Western Palestine: Memoirs of the Topography, Orography, Hydrography, and Archaeology. Vol. 3. London: Committee of the Palestine Exploration Fund.
- Fabri, F. (1896). Felix Fabri (circa 1480–1483 A.D.) vol I, part II. Palestine Pilgrims' Text Society.
- Finegan, Jack (2014) [1992]. "The Life of John the Baptist". The Archeology of the New Testament: The Life of Jesus and the Beginning of the Early Church (revised ed.). Princeton University Press. p. 4. ISBN 9781400863181.
- Maundrell, H. (1703). A Journey from Aleppo to Jerusalem: At Easter, A. D. 1697. Oxford: Printed at the Theatre.
- Pringle, D. (1993). The Churches of the Crusader Kingdom of Jerusalem: A-K (excluding Acre and Jerusalem). Vol. I. Cambridge University Press. ISBN 0-521-39036-2.
- Saewolf (1892). Saewolf (A.D. 1102, 1103). Palestine Pilgrims' Text Society.
- Saller, Sylvester John (1946). Discoveries at St. John's 'Ein Karim, 1941-1942. Franciscan Press. OCLC 634304194.
- Sharon, M. (2004). "'Ein Kārem ('Ayn Kārim)". Corpus Inscriptionum Arabicarum Palaestinae. Vol. 3: D-F. BRILL. pp. 155-157. ISBN 9004131973.
