= Saint-Vincent-de-Paul =

Saint-Vincent-de-Paul (named after Saint Vincent de Paul) may refer to:

- Saint-Vincent-de-Paul, Gironde, France
- Saint-Vincent-de-Paul, Landes, France
- Saint-Vincent-de-Paul, Paris, 10th arrondissement of Paris, France
- Saint-Vincent-de-Paul, Quebec, a former city that is now a district of the city of Laval, Quebec

== See also ==
- Vincent de Paul (disambiguation)
