= The Saint Vincent de Paul Food Pantry Stomp =

Poem by Martín Espada

"The Saint Vincent de Paul Food Pantry Stomp" is a widely anthologized short poem by Martín Espada.

The poem was published in number 33 of the journal River Styx. It was collected in 1990 in Espada's bilingual volume of poems entitled Rebellion is the Circle of a Lover's Hands. When published in River Styx, the journal was bundled with a CD of a poetry reading that included Espada reading the poem.

== Overview ==
The setting for the poem is Madison, Wisconsin in 1980. It is free verse in form. In a talk he gave at the University of Arizona in 1992, Espada stated that in his "wanderings" between New York and Puerto Rico, he traveled to Wisconsin to go to school. He came upon hard times, and ultimately found himself "officially destitute," which is when he visited the Saint Vincent de Paul Food Pantry. It was at the food pantry that he had the experience which inspired this poem.

== Analysis ==
Through the entirety of the poem, Espada creates vivid imagery for the reader, especially through his use of metaphor and simile. Due to the fact that he is a largely political writer, it is likely that Espada meant this poem to be a protest against the way people treat the poor. This is evidenced by the phrase "Christian suspicion" in the second line of the poem. In the end, he uses the phrase "a maraca shaker in the salsa band of the unemployed," a reference to his Latino heritage.

== Reception ==
Writing in Partisan Review, Roger Gilbert called the poem "very funny" as it "transforms the speaker's furtive attempt to conceal and take possession of a stray dollar bill while tying his shoes into a salsa-tinged dance performed in honor of the patron saint of canned food." The poem, Gilbert writes, "offers a wry yet biting analysis of the tangled relations between ethnic culture and that ever-in-demand commodity, money."

When the poem was republished in an anthology of poems inspired by saints in 2014, Natalie Morrill wrote in the magazine Dappled Things that the poem possess a "delightful musicality and wit."

The poem has been widely anthologized including in

- Literature: A Portable Anthology (2003) edited by Janet E. Gardner, Beverly Lawn, Jack Ridl, and Peter Schakel
- Approaching literature: writing & reading & thinking (2007) by Peter Schakel and Jack Ridl
- The Hungry Ear: Poems of Food and Drink (2014) edited by Kevin Young
- St. Peter’s B-list: Contemporary Poems Inspired by the Saints (2014) edited by Mary Ann B. Miller
- Anthology of Contemporary American Poetry (2014) edited by Cary Nelson
- The Poetry of Capital: Voices from twenty-first-century America (2020) edited by Benjamin Grossberg and Clare Rossini
