= St. Vincent de Paul Elementary & Junior High =

St. Vincent De Paul School

Location
- 4525 - 49 Street N.W. Calgary, Alberta; Canada

Information
- School type: Elementary and Junior High
- Motto: "With a look toward the future"
- Religious affiliation: Roman Catholic
- School board: Calgary Catholic School District
- Principal: Heather Enzie
- Grades: K-9
- Mascot: Viking
- Website: www.cssd.ab.ca/schools/stvincent/

St. Vincent de Paul School is a Catholic elementary and junior high school in Calgary, Canada.

== Options ==
There are many options in the school for junior high such as Sports Performance, Drama, Art, French (Grade 8 and 9 only. It is mandatory for grade 7), and Band. Up until the 2012-2013 school year, information processing (referred to as "info pro") was also available. Junior high students choose two options prior to the new school year.

== Drama ==
The St. Vincent de Paul drama option is available throughout elementary. Productions have included Romeo And Winifred, The Case Of The Missing Ring, and Charlie And The Chocolate Factory. More recent productions include "Greece the Musical", "Peggy the Pint-Sized Pirate", "Snow White", and "The Superhero Support Group".

== Sports ==
The sports teams include volleyball, cross country (which won 13 years in a row), basketball, badminton, and flag football. Pep rallies are held regularly, the most notable being a volleyball game with teachers playing against students

== Computer lab ==
The school does not have computer labs anymore but now have chromebooks.

== Modernization ==
On January 21, 2014, the Alberta government announced that St. Vincent De Paul would be one of the nine schools in Calgary to be renovated. Many repairs, including an approx. 2 million dollar roof repair, will be performed over the next two years. Most repairs will take place on the elementary segment of the school, sending elementary students to Monsignor E.L Doyle School. Junior high students, although being moved mostly to portable classrooms, will have access to the gymnasium, Career Technology Studies (CTS) labs, band room and washrooms. A Lifelong learning program is being proposed, substituting a second option, where students choose a program for three forty-five-minute periods, one day out of the six-day-cycle.
