= Jack Finegan =

American biblical scholar and professor (1908–2000)

- Born: July 11, 1908; Des Moines, Iowa, U.S.
- Died: July 15, 2000 (aged 92); Oakland, California, U.S.
- Education: Drake University (BA, MA, BD); Colgate Rochester Crozer Divinity School (BD, MTh)
- Occupations: Biblical scholar; professor
- Spouse: Mildred Meader (m. 1934)
- Children: 1

Jack Finegan (July 11, 1908 – July 15, 2000) was an American biblical scholar and Professor of New Testament History and Archaeology at the Pacific School of Religion in Berkeley, California. While a professor at Iowa State University in Ames, Iowa, he published Light from the Ancient Past in 1946. He was notable for his views on biblical chronology.

== Early life and education ==
Jack Finegan was born on July 11, 1908 in Des Moines, Iowa to Henry Mentor Finegan and Clarissa Atemisha Chestnut.

He attended Drake University receiving a B.A. in 1928, a M.A. in 1929, and a B.D. in 1930. He then attended the Colgate Rochester Divinity School, receiving a B.D. 1931 and a M.Th. in 1932.

== Career ==
Finegan taught religion and biblical studies at Iowa State College (now Iowa State University) in Ames, Iowa, where he served as a professor of religion and later as head of the Department of Religion. During this time, he was also active in church ministry, serving as pastor of First Christian Church of Ames.

He later joined the faculty of the Pacific School of Religion in Berkeley, California, where he served as Professor of New Testament History and Archaeology and was eventually named professor emeritus. His teaching and scholarship focused on New Testament history, archaeology, and biblical chronology. Finegan was also associated with the Palestine Institute of Archaeology, contributing to the study of the historical geography of the Bible.

Alongside his academic career, Finegan was an ordained minister in the Christian Church (Disciples of Christ) and served as pastor of University Christian Church in Berkeley.

== Personal life and death ==
Finegan married Mildred C Meader on September 4, 1934. Together they had a son, Jack Richard Finegan.

He died on July 15, 2000 in Oakland, California.

== Works ==
- Light from the Ancient Past-The Archaeological Background of the Hebrew-Christian Religion, J. Finegan, 1946, 2nd ed. 1959
- Chronology of the New Testament, W. Armstrong and J. Finegan, ISBE
- The Archeology of World Religions, J. Finnegan, 1952
- Handbook of Biblical Chronology: Principles of Time Reckoning in the Ancient World and Problems of Chronology in the Bible, 1964, 2nd ed. 1998
- Encountering New Testament Manuscripts: A Working Introduction to Textual Criticism
- Hidden Records of the Life of Jesus
- Discovering Israel Archaeological Guide to the Holy Land
- The Archaeology of the New Testament: The Mediterranean of the Early Christian Apostles, 1981
- Beginnings in Theology, Jack Finegan, 1956
