= Greswell =

Greswell or Gresswell may refer to:

- Bill Greswell (1889–1971), English cricketer
- Dan Gresswell (1819–1883), English veterinary surgeon
- Edward Greswell (1797–1869), English churchman and chronologist
- Ernest Greswell (1885–1962), English cricketer, brother of Bill Greswell
- Jeaffreson Greswell (1916–2000), Royal Air Force officer
- Richard Greswell (1800–1881), English academic and re-founder of the National Society
- William Parr Greswell (1765–1854), English clergyman and bibliographer, father of Edward and Richard Greswell

== See also ==
- Cresswell (disambiguation)
