= William Greswell =

William Greswell may refer to:

- William Parr Greswell, clergyman and bibliographer
- Bill Greswell, cricketer
