= Mount of Transfiguration =

Location mentioned in the Bible

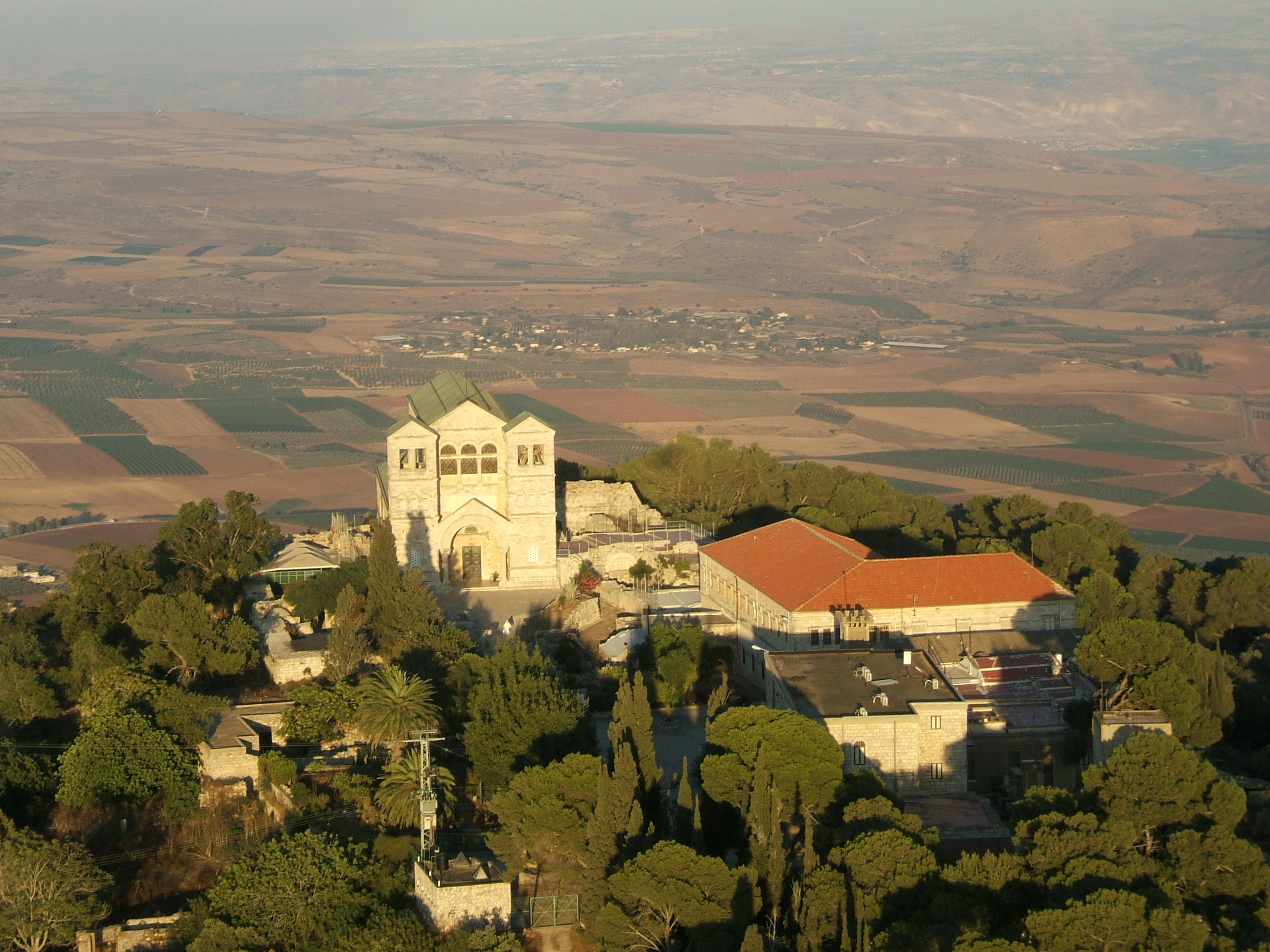
The Franciscan Church of the Transfiguration on Mount Tabor

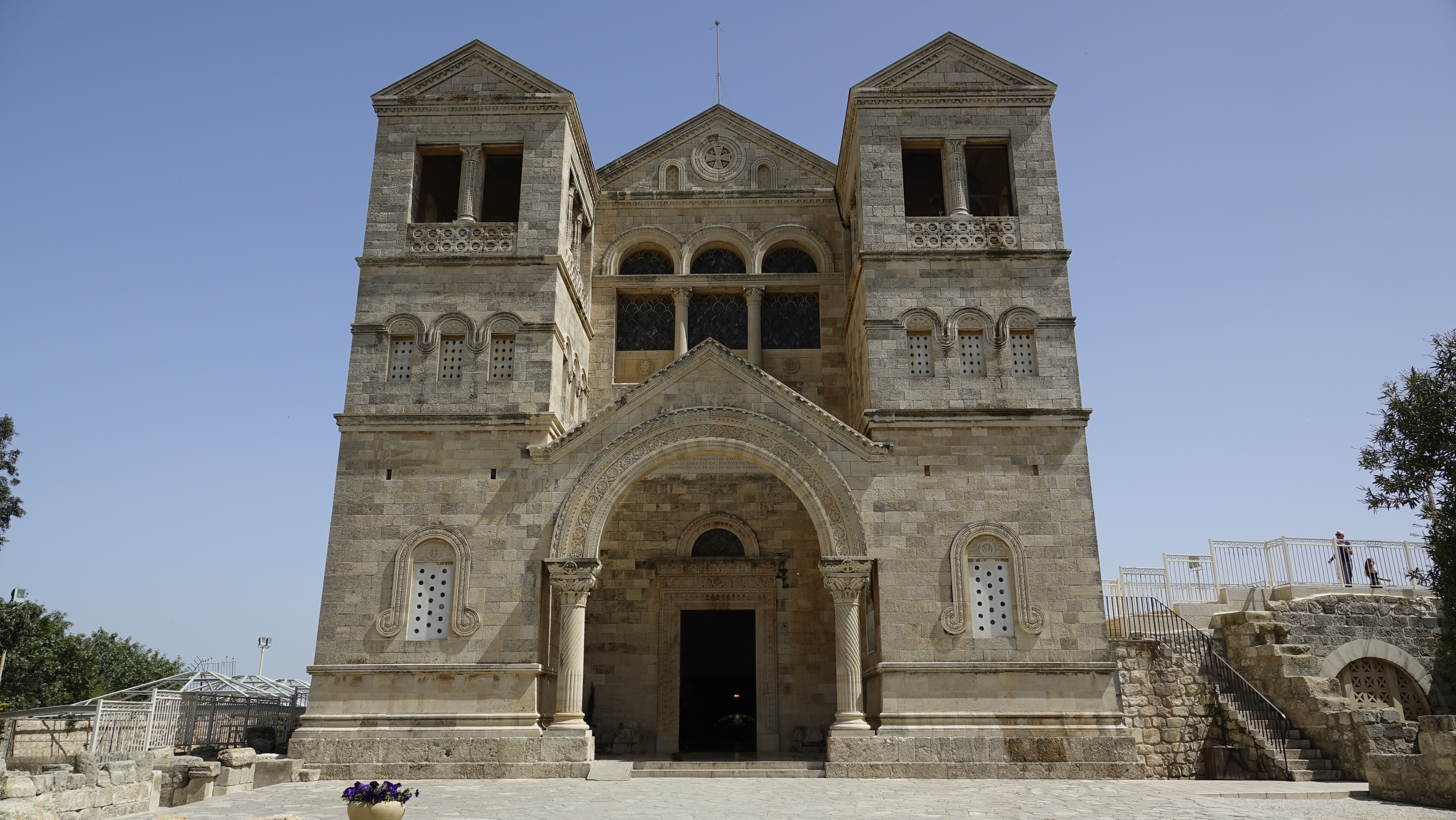
The Church of the Transfiguration

The New Testament does not identify the mountain upon which Jesus underwent his Transfiguration. The synoptic gospels each recount the event with similar language, with Matthew's account as follows:

“And after six days Jesus taketh Peter, James, and John his brother, and bringeth them up into an high mountain apart, And was transfigured before them: and his face did shine as the sun, and his raiment was white as the light. And, behold, there appeared unto them Moses and Elijah talking with him. Then answered Peter, and said unto Jesus, Lord, it is good for us to be here: if thou wilt, let us make here three tabernacles; one for thee, and one for Moses, and one for Elijah. While he yet spake, behold, a bright cloud overshadowed them: and behold a voice out of the cloud, which said, This is my beloved Son, in whom I am well pleased; hear ye him. And when the disciples heard it, they fell on their face, and were sore afraid. And Jesus came and touched them, and said, Arise, and be not afraid. And when they had lifted up their eyes, they saw no man, save Jesus only. And as they came down from the mountain, Jesus charged them, saying, Tell the vision to no man, until the Son of man be risen again from the dead.” (Matthew 17:1–9, KJV)

Several candidates have been suggested:

== Mount Tabor ==
Mount Tabor (575 metres or 1,886 feet high) is the traditional location. The earliest identification of the Mount of Transfiguration as Tabor is by Origen in the 3rd century. It is also mentioned by St. Cyril of Jerusalem and St. Jerome in the 4th century. It is later mentioned in the 5th-century Transitus Beatae Mariae Virginis. The summit of Mount Tabor is also referenced as the place of the Transfiguration according to the Mystical City of God by Venerable Mary of Jesus of Ágreda (1602–1665), who writes: "For His Transfiguration He selected a high mountain in the center of Galilee, two leagues east of Nazareth and called Mount Tabor." The Church of the Transfiguration is located atop Mount Tabor.

== Mount Hermon ==
Mount Hermon (2,814 metres or 9,232 feet high) was suggested by J. Lightfoot (1602–1675) and R. H. Fuller (1915–2007) for two reasons: It is the highest site in the area [given that the Transfiguration took place on "a high mountain" (Matthew 17:1)], and it is located near Caesarea Philippi (Matthew 16:13), where the previous events reportedly took place.

== Other locations ==
Other locations that have been proposed include: one of the Horns of Hattin, by R. W. Stewart (1857); Gebel Germaq (1,208 metres), 5 kilometres southwest of Safed, by W. Ewing (1906); Tel El-Ahmar (1,452 metres) on Jabal al-Druze, by Gustav Dalman (1924); Mount Nebo by H. A. Whittaker (1987); and Mount Sinai by Benjamin Urrutia. Others, such as A. Loisy (1908), have deliberately rejected seeking a geographical location.
