= Church of the Transfiguration =

Franciscan church on Mount Tabor in Israel

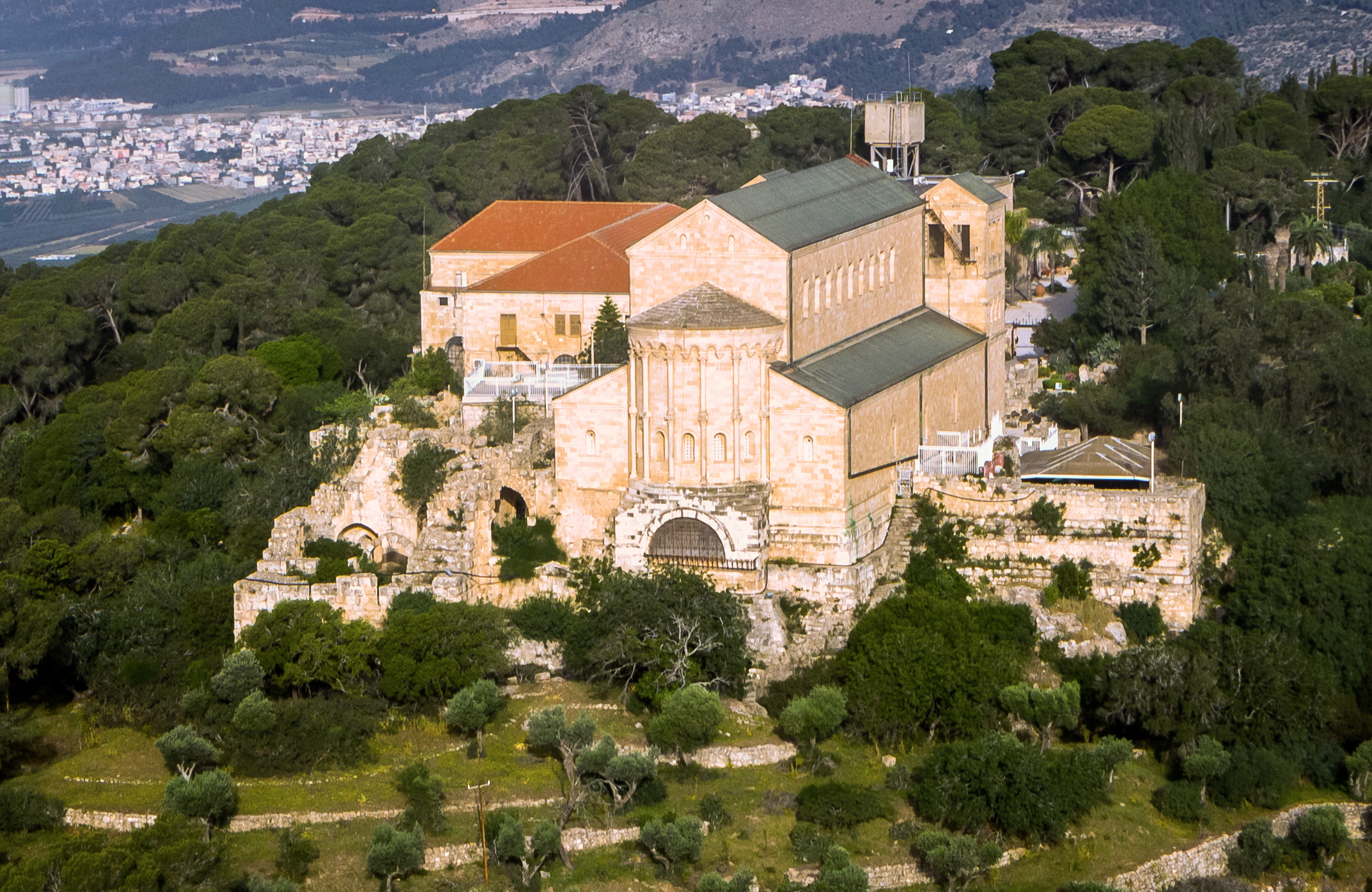
- Aerial view of the Church

Religion
- Affiliation: Roman Catholicism
- District: Northern District
- Province: Lower Galilee
- Ecclesiastical or organizational status: Active
- Leadership: Franciscan Order
- Year consecrated: June 1924

Location
- Location: Mount Tabor
- Country: Israel
- Interactive map of Church of the Transfiguration
- Coordinates: 32.6862°N 35.3929°E

Architecture
- Architect: Antonio Barluzzi
- Completed: 1924

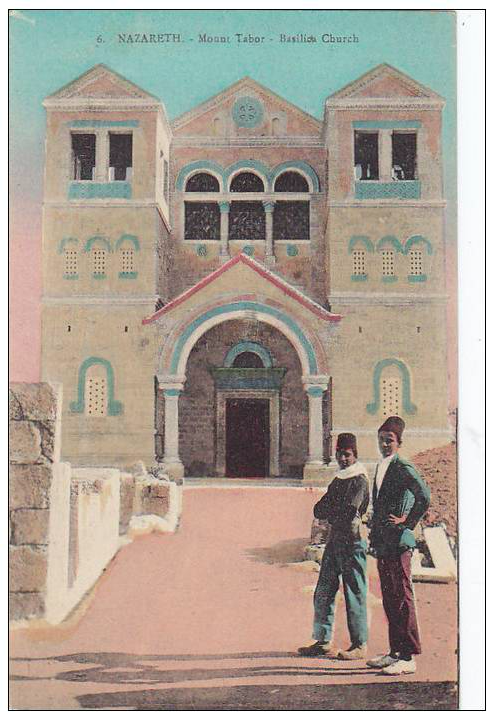
The "Mount Tabor - Basilica Church", by Karimeh Abbud, circa 1925

The Church of the Transfiguration (Arabic: كنيسة التجلي, romanized: Kanīsat At-tajalli, Hebrew: כנסיית ההשתנות) is a Franciscan church located on Mount Tabor in Israel. It is traditionally believed to be the site where the Transfiguration of Jesus took place, an event in the Gospels in which Jesus is transfigured upon an unnamed mountain and speaks with Moses and Elijah.

== History ==
The current church, part of a Franciscan monastery complex, was completed in 1924. The architect was Antonio Barluzzi. It was built on the ruins of an ancient (4th–6th-century) Byzantine church and a 12th-century church of the Crusader Kingdom period. There is a Greek Orthodox church located on Mount Tabor as well, dedicated to the same purpose.

== Architecture ==
The church contains three grottoes belonging to the Crusader church. They were described by Jonas Korte, a publisher from Eldena, as "three chapels, with a small altar. They are called tabernacles, and they are said to represent the three huts which Peter desired to build, one for his Master (Jesus), the other two for Moses and Elias (Elijah)".

The Grotto of Christ is in the eastern part of the church. Steps lead down to a lower level containing a sanctuary roofed with a modern vault.

There is a chapel in each of the two towers at the western end of the church. The Chapel of Elijah is located in the south tower; the north tower holds the Chapel of Moses.

In the upper part of the church there is a mosaic on a gold ground representing the Transfiguration. On August 6, which is the "day of the Transfiguration" in some church calendars, the sun strikes a glass plate set into the floor so that the golden mosaic is briefly illuminated.

Barluzzi created a roof built of alabaster panels, meant to let in as much light as possible in accordance to the biblical event celebrated here. However, the alabaster roof could not be made watertight and had to be covered over with a common, non-translucent roof.

== The Transfiguration ==
The Transfiguration of Jesus is an event reported by the Synoptic Gospels in which Jesus is transfigured upon a mountain (Matthew 17:1–9, Mark 9:2–8, Luke 9:28–36). Jesus becomes radiant, speaks with Moses and Elijah, and is called "Son" by God. The transfiguration put Jesus above Moses and Elijah, the two preeminent figures of Judaism.

Several mountains have been identified as the site of the Transfiguration; for example, Mount Hermon. Mount Tabor is closer to the center of Jesus's activities, and therefore the Bishop Cyril of Jerusalem wrote in the year 348 that he preferred Mount Tabor to Mount Hermon. Thus Mount Tabor was accepted as the site of the transfiguration of Christ.

== Gallery ==
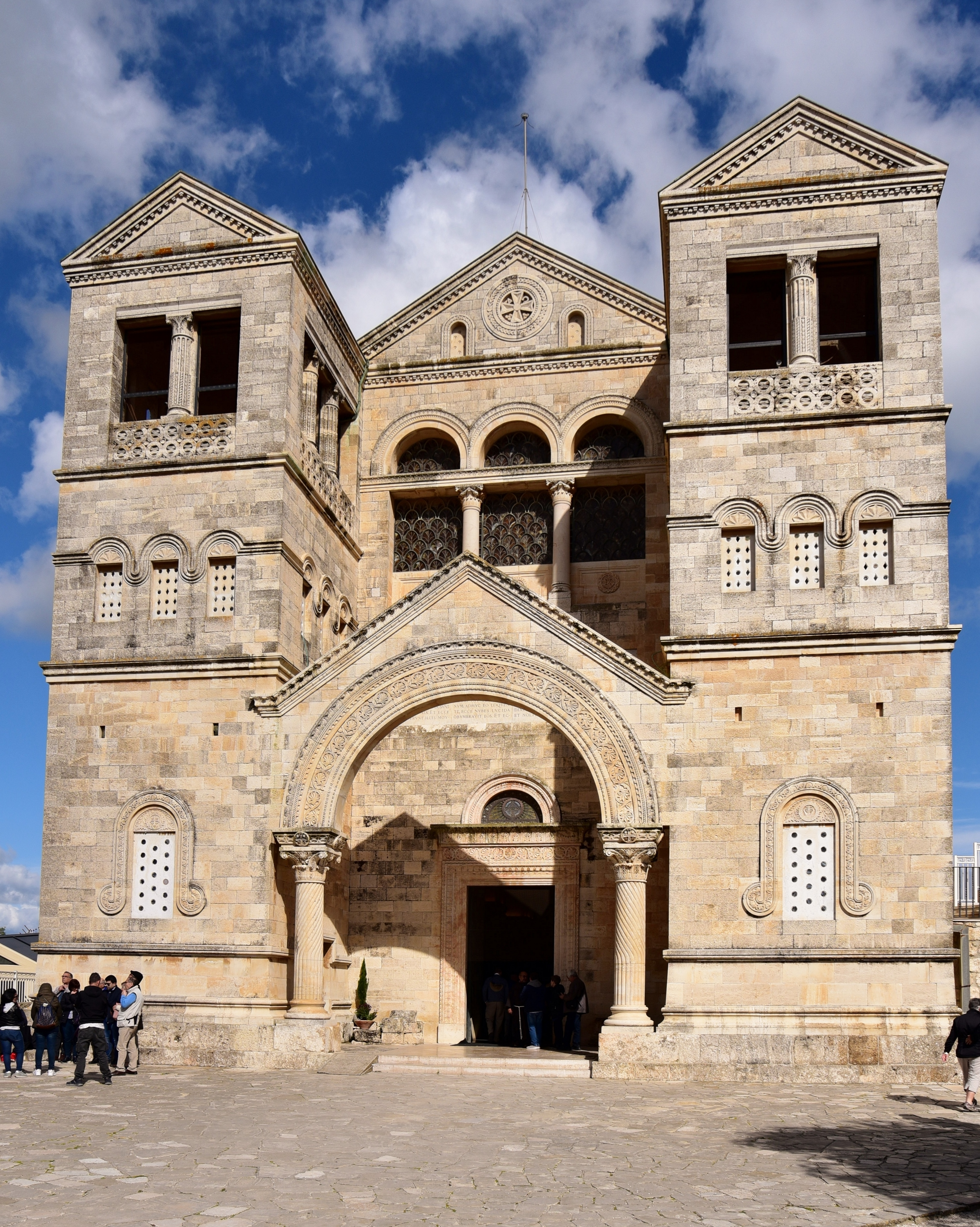
Exterior view

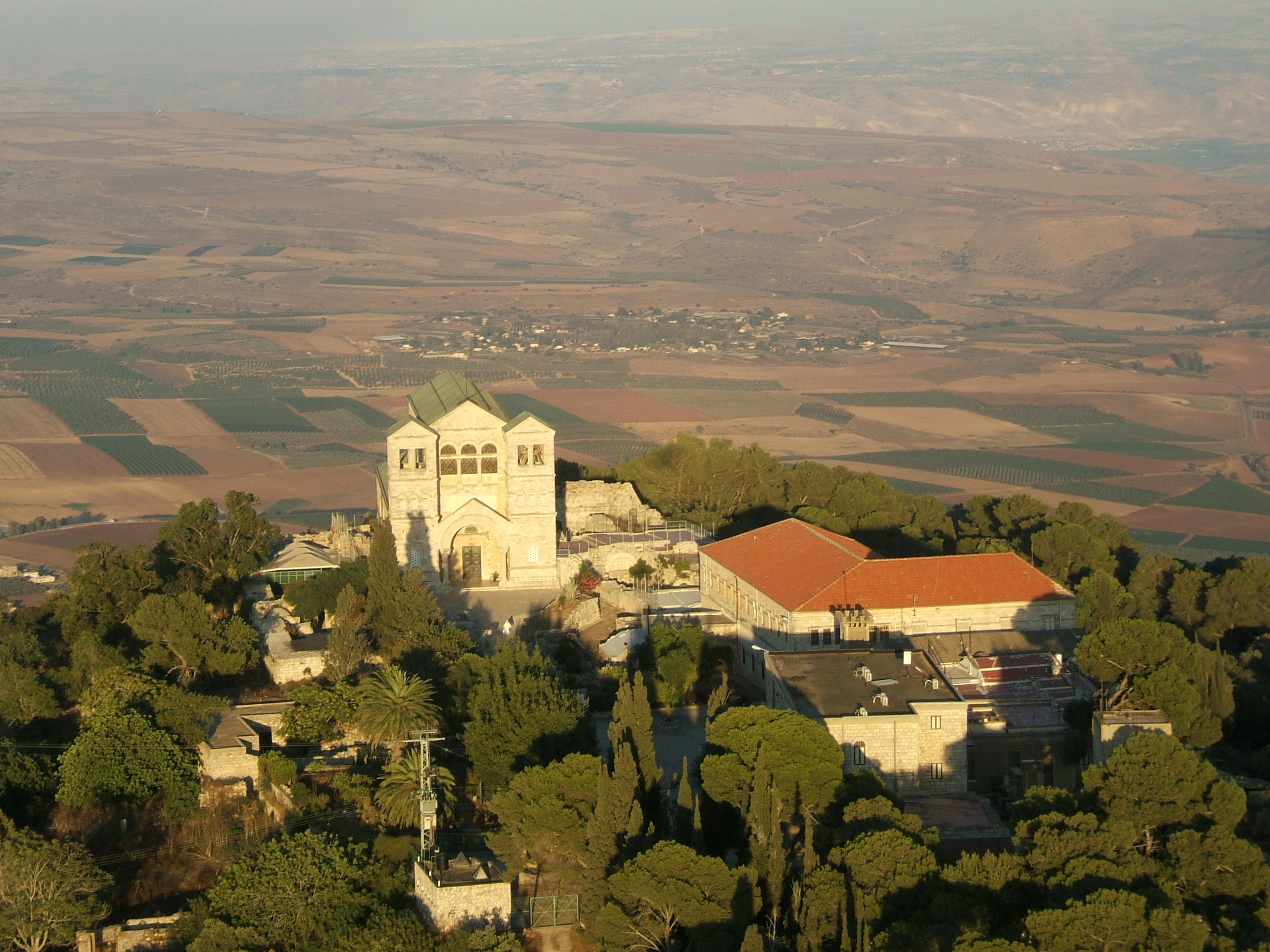
Aerial view

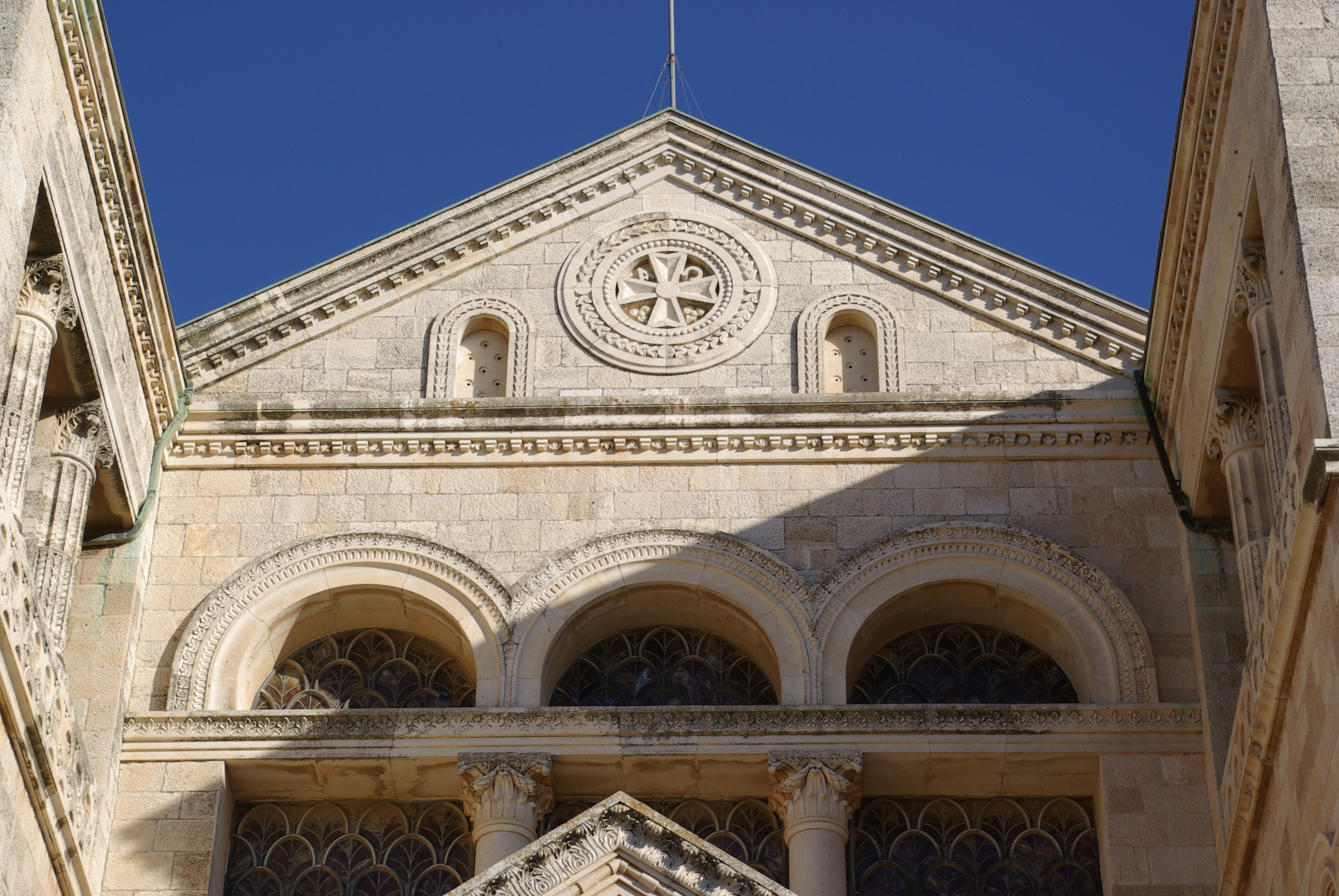
The facade

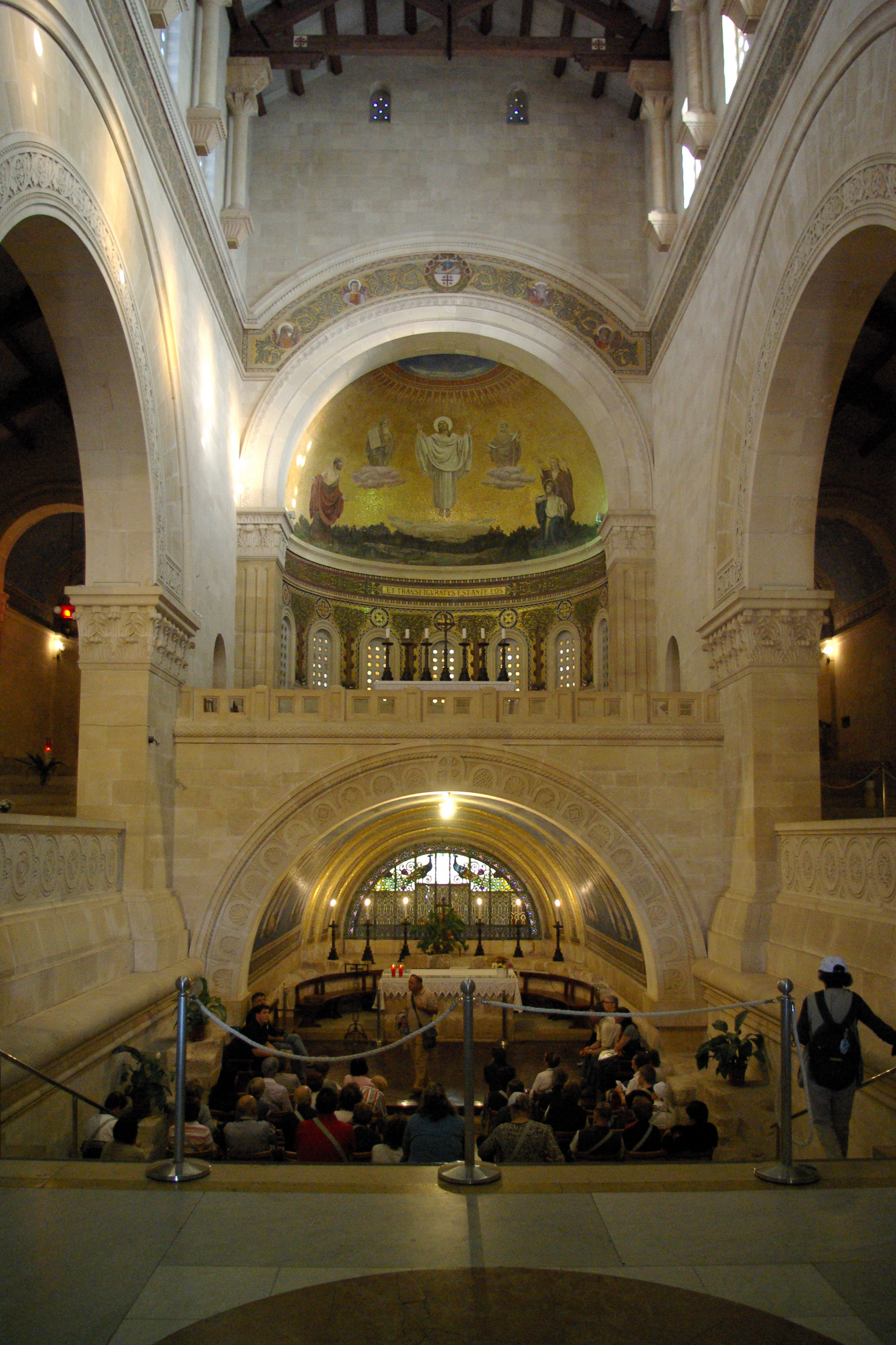
Church interior

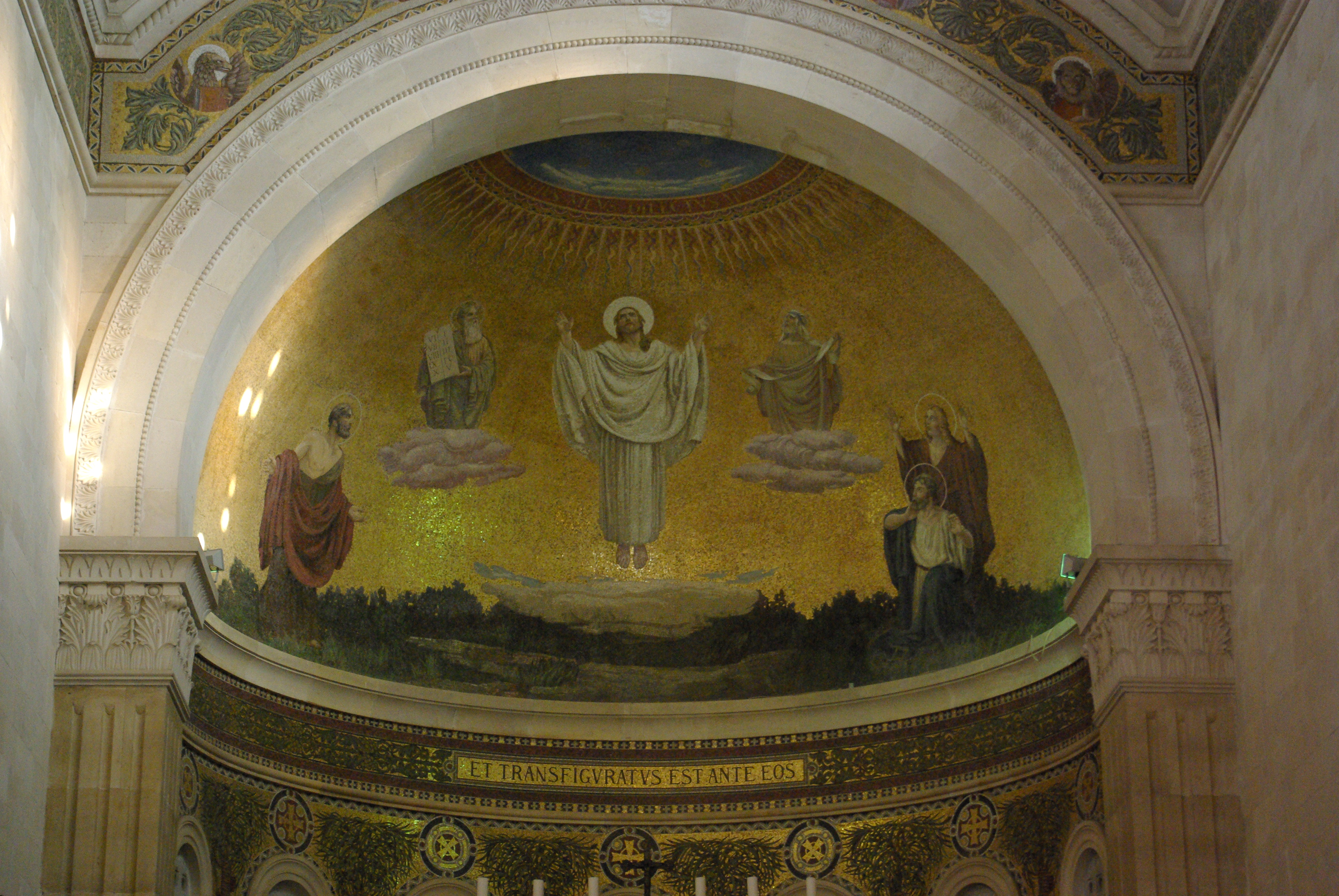
The Mosaic

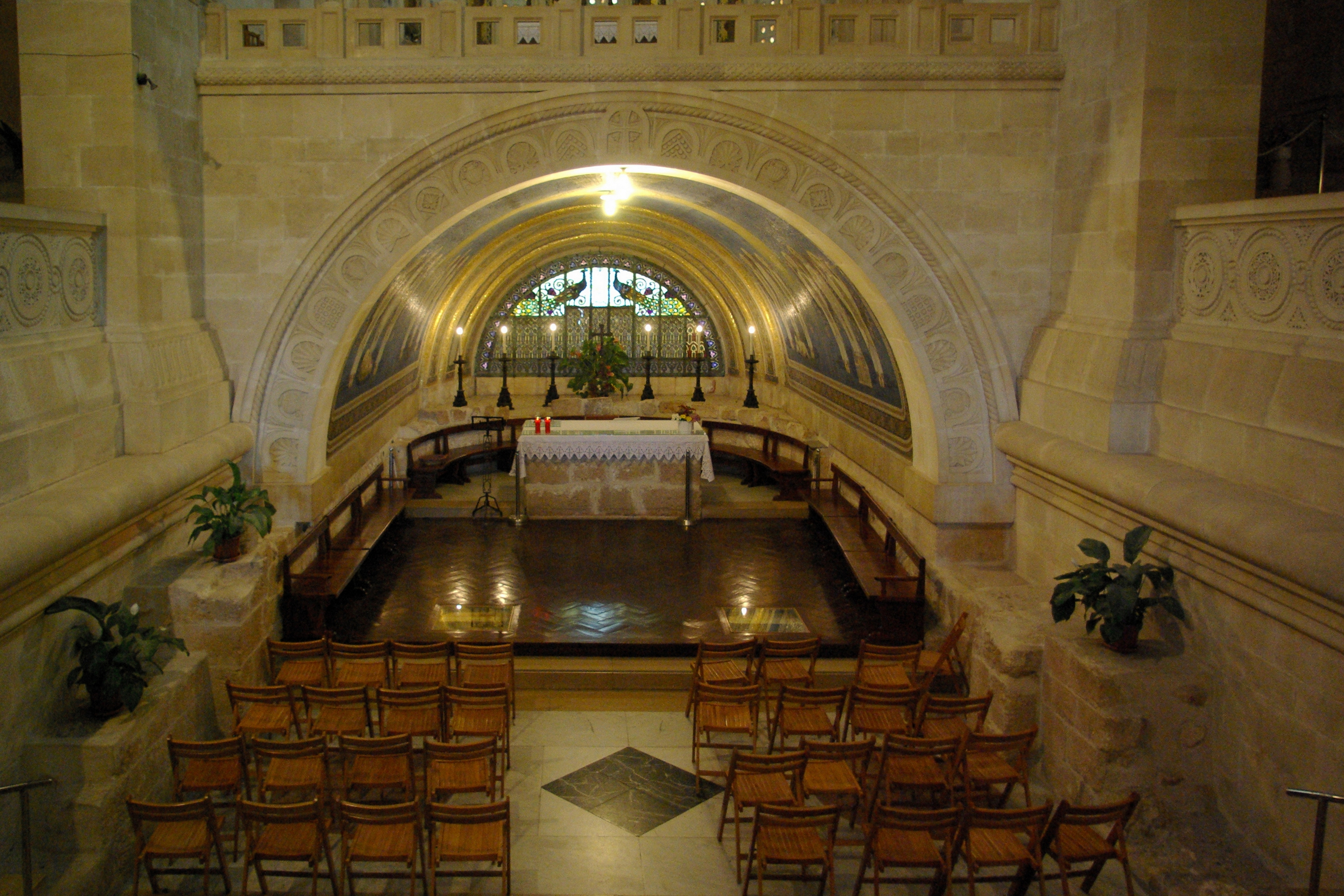
Chapel beneath the Mosaic
