= Robert Mimpriss =

English Sunday school worker (1797–1875)

Robert Mimpriss (14 January, 1797 – 20 December 1875) was an English Sunday school worker notable for his biblical and Christian writings.

== Biography ==
He was born in Deptford, Kent on 14 January 1797. In 1821 he married a lady of fortune and thenceforth devoted himself to the development of Sunday schools. He presented Christian gospels as a continuous narrative and made it easier to be taught in schools. He died in Clapham on 20 December 1875.

== Bibliography ==
His notable books include:

- The Gospel treasury, and expository harmony of the four evangelists
- A harmony of the four Gospels, in the English authorized version, arranged according to Greswell's "Harmonia evangelica" in Greek
- The Teacher's Manual Acts of the Apostles.
- Studies on the Gospels in Harmony
- The life of Christ harmonized from the four Evangelists
- Christ an example for the young : exhibited in the gospel narrative of the four evangelists
- The steps of Jesus: a narrative harmony of the four Evangelists
