= Ernest Greswell =

English cricketer

Personal information
- Full name: Ernest Arthur Greswell
- Born: 8 June 1885; Cuddalore, Madras, India
- Died: 15 January 1962 (aged 76); Minehead, Somerset, England
- Batting: Right-handed
- Bowling: Right-arm slow

Domestic team information
- Years: Team
- 1903–1910: Somerset

Career statistics
| Competition | FC |
|---|---|
| Matches | 12 |
| Runs scored | 246 |
| Batting average | 11.71 |
| 100s/50s | 0/0 |
| Top score | 44 |
| Balls bowled | 144 |
| Wickets | 2 |
| Bowling average | 44.50 |
| 5 wickets in innings | 0 |
| 10 wickets in match | 0 |
| Best bowling | 1/5 |
| Catches/stumpings | 5/– |
- Source: CricketArchive, 22 December 2015

Ernest Arthur Greswell (8 June 1885 in Cuddalore, Madras, India – 15 January 1962 in Minehead, Somerset, England), played first-class cricket for Somerset in 12 matches between 1903 and 1910.

A right-handed opening or middle order batsman and a right-arm slow bowler, Ernest Greswell was educated at Repton School and made his debut for Somerset in a single match in 1903, aged 18, when he opened the innings with Lionel Palairet.

In 1908, his younger brother Bill Greswell started playing for Somerset, becoming a regular member of the side in 1909, and in that season Ernest reappeared in six matches, with a further five in 1910. His highest score was only 44, made in the 1909 match against Middlesex in which brother Bill scored his only first-class century. While Bill went on to a successful, if intermittent, cricket career, Ernest did not play first-class cricket after 1910.
