= Richard Greswell =

British scientist

Richard Greswell (22 July 1800 – 22 July 1881) was an English college teacher and promoter of church schools, known as the re-founder of the National Society.

== Life ==
Greswell was born at Denton, Lancashire, on 22 July 1800, the fourth son of the Rev. William Parr Greswell. He was educated first by his father, and then at Worcester College, Oxford, on the foundation of which college he was placed on 1 June 1818. In 1822, having gained a double-first, he was appointed assistant tutor of Worcester, and in the next year full tutor, a post he retained for thirty years. He became fellow in June 1824. He graduated B.A. in 1822, M.A. in 1825, and B.D. in 1836. He was elected a fellow of the Royal Society in 1830.

As a tutor Greswell was learned and skilful, and his lectures were considered models in their way. For many years he devoted the proceeds of his tutorship to public and charitable objects, his personal expenses being defrayed from a modest fortune brought by his wife, Joana Julia Armitriding, whom he married in 1836. In 1843 he opened a subscription on behalf of national education, with a donation of £1,000, and ultimately raised £250,000 for the funds of the National Society. He was largely instrumental in establishing the new museum at Oxford, and was one of the founders of the Ashmolean Society.

From 1847 to 1865 Greswell acted as chairman of Gladstone's election committee at Oxford. He was a benefactor to his father's parish of Denton, and by his efforts a new church, called Christ Church, was built and provided with parsonage, schools, and endowment (1853). Many kindly and beneficent acts are related of Greswell, whose 'chief characteristics were great and varied learning, boundless benevolence, and a childlike simplicity'.

Greswell died at Oxford on 22 July 1881, aged exactly 81 years. His daughter, Joana Julia Greswell, published at Oxford in 1873 a 'Grammatical Analysis of the Hebrew Psalter.'

== Works ==
Greswell's publications were a paper On Education and the Principles of Art, 1843, and a Memorial on the Proposed Oxford University Lecture-rooms, Library, Museums, &c., 1853.
