= Dan Gresswell =

English veterinary surgeon (1819–1883)

Dan Gresswell (1819–1883), was an English veterinary surgeon.

Gresswell was born on 13 May 1819 at Kelsey Hall, Spilsby, Lincolnshire. He became in 1840 a member of the Royal College of Veterinary Surgeons; and in the same year was elected fellow of the Veterinary Medical Association in recognition of an essay upon ‘Lactiferous Glands.’ He settled in Louth about the same time, and became widely known as a veterinary surgeon.

On 20 February 1877 he was elected fellow of the College of Veterinary Surgeons as a reward for original research. He wrote many original papers on ‘Paralysis in the Horse,’ ‘Excision of the Uterus in the Cow,’ ‘Treatment and Ætiology of Splenic Apoplexy or Anthrax,’ ‘Tetanus,’ ‘Arsenical Poisoning,’ and other subjects. His sons have, since his death, published several works on veterinary science, partly embodying his manuscripts and verbal instructions. He took an active part in local politics as a strong conservative, and did much to improve the sanitary arrangements of Louth. He was elected to the town council on 1 November 1862, alderman in April 1871, and mayor on 9 November of the same year.

He continued to be an alderman until his death at Kelsey House, Louth, 13 March 1883. He married, 18 December 1845, Anne Beastall of Reston, near Louth, by whom he had eight sons and seven daughters. They all survived him.
