= Edward Greswell =

British chronologist

Edward Greswell (1797–1869) was an English churchman and academic, known as a chronologist.

== Life ==
The son of the Rev. William Parr Greswell, he was born at Denton near Manchester, on 3 August 1797. He was educated by his father and at Manchester Grammar School. He matriculated at Brasenose College, Oxford, on 5 April 1815, and was elected scholar in the same year. Early in 1816 he obtained the Lancashire scholarship at Corpus Christi College and graduated B.A. in 1819, M.A. in 1822, and B.D. in 1830.

He was ordained deacon in 1825, and priest in 1826, and held the office of college tutor from 1822 to 1834. He was Fellow of Corpus Christi College from 1823 until his death in 1869; he held the college posts of Latin reader in 1824, junior dean 1825, Greek reader 1827, librarian 1830, and vice-president of his college from 1840 to 1869.

He died on 29 June 1869.

== Works ==
Greswell took part in the disputes at Oxford about 1836 in connection with Renn Hampden's appointment as Regius Professor of Divinity, and published a Letter to his Grace the Duke of Wellington, Chancellor of the University, on the subject (Oxford, 1837). His works included:

- Dissertations upon the Principles and Arrangement of a Harmony of the Gospels, Oxford, 1830, 3 vols. On it Robert Mimpriss based his exegetical work ("Mimpriss system") intended for Sunday schools.
- Harmonia Evangelica, 1830, 1837, 1840; 5th edit. 1855.
- Joannis Miltoni Fabulæ, Samson Agonistes et Comus Græcè, 1832.
- Supplementary dissertations on the Harmonies, 1834.
- An Exposition of the Parables, and of other parts of the Gospels, 1834–5, 6 vols.
- Prolegomena ad Harmoniam Evangelicam, 1840.
- Fasti Temporis Catholici and Origines Kalendariæ: History of the Primitive Calendar, Part 1, 1852, 4 vols.
- General Tables of the Fasti Catholici, or Fasti Temporis Perpetui, from B.C. 4004 to A.D. 2000, 1852.
- Supplementary Tables and Introduction to the Tables of the Fasti Catholici, 1852.
- Origines Kalendariæ Italicæ, 1854, 4 vols.
- Origines Kalendariæ Hellenicæ, 6 vols. 1861.
- The Three Witnesses and the Threefold Cord; being the testimoney of the Natural Measures of Time, of the Primitive Civil Calendar, and of Antediluvian and Postdiluvian Tradition, on the Principal Questions of Fact in Sacred and Profane Antiquity, 1862.
- The Objections to the Historical Character of the Pentateuch in Part I of Dr. Colenso's "Pentateuch and Book of Joshua," considered and shewn to be unfounded, London, 1863.
- The Zulus and the Men of Science, London, 1865.

Greswell also printed for private circulation a translation into Greek iambics of three hymns by Thomas Ken, 1831, and a hymn of praise in English.
