= William Parr Greswell =

William Parr Greswell (1765–1854) was an English clergyman and bibliographer.

== Life ==
William Parr Greswell, son of John Greswell of Chester, was baptised at Tarvin, Cheshire, on 23 June 1765. He was ordained on 20 September 1789 to the curacy of Blackley, near Manchester, and succeeded on 24 September 1791 to the incumbency of Denton, also near Manchester, on the presentation of the first Earl of Wilton, to whose son he was tutor. This living, which when he took it was only worth £100 a year, he held for the long period of sixty-three years. To add to his income he opened a school.

Greswell educated his own seven sons, five of whom went to Oxford and won high honours. They were William, M. A., fellow of Balliol, and author of works on ritual, died 1876; Edward, B.D., fellow and tutor of Corpus Christi College; Richard, B.D., fellow and tutor of Worcester College; Francis Hague, M.A., fellow of Brasenose; Clement, M.A., fellow and tutor of Oriel, and rector of Tortworth, Gloucestershire. His other sons were Charles, a medical man, and Thomas, master of Chetham's Hospital, Manchester.

== Death ==
Greswell resigned his incumbency of Denton in 1853, and died on 12 January 1854, aged 89, and was buried at Denton. His large library was sold at Sotheby's in February 1855.

== Works ==
Greswell wrote:

- Memoirs of Angelus Politianus, Picus of Mirandula, Sanazarius, Bembus, Fracastorius, M. A. Flaminius, and the Amalthei, with poetical translations, Manchester, 1801, 2nd ed. 1805. The Retrospective Review (ix. 64, note) condemned this work as careless and unmethodical.
- Annals of Parisian Typography (privately printed), 1818.
- The Monastery of Saint Werburgh, a Poem, 1823. To some copies are added "Rodrigo, a Spanish Legend", and shorter pieces.
- A View of the Early Parisian Greek Press, including the Lives of the Stephani, Oxford, 1833, 2 vols.; 2nd ed. with an appendix of Casauboniana, 1840. He also edited the third volume of the catalogue of the Chetham Library, 1826. The two works on the Parisian press were said by Jacques Charles Brunet to be "inexact".
