= Bill Greswell =

English cricketer (1889–1971)

Personal information
- Full name: William Territt Greswell
- Born: 15 October 1889; Cuddalore, Madras Presidency, British India
- Died: 12 February 1971 (aged 81); Bicknoller, Somerset, England
- Batting: Right-handed
- Bowling: Right-arm medium
- Role: Bowler
- Relatives: Ernest Greswell (brother)

Domestic team information
- Years: Team
- 1908–1930: Somerset
- FC debut: 3 August 1908 Somerset v Middlesex
- Last FC: 6 June 1933 Free Foresters v Oxford University

Career statistics
Competition	First-class
Matches	134
Runs scored	2,580
Batting average	14.91
100s/50s	1/4
Top score	100
Balls bowled	28,553
Wickets	540
Bowling average	21.32
5 wickets in innings	37
10 wickets in match	7
Best bowling	9/62
Catches/stumpings	103/–
- Source: CricketArchive, 31 October 2009

William Territt Greswell (15 October 1889 – 12 February 1971) was an English first-class cricketer who played for Somerset from 1908 to 1930. But his career as a tea-planter with the family company in Ceylon meant that he appeared in only 115 first-class matches for the county in that period, and was a regular player in only five seasons, dotted over almost 20 years.

== Cricket style ==
Born at Cuddalore in British India, Bill Greswell was a bowler of medium-paced right-arm in-swingers, and a right-handed batsman who batted mostly in the lower order. He was mainly a bowler, and was regarded throughout his career as an unusual player for the late movement that he achieved off the pitch. "Cricket's cognoscenti talked and wrote about him in the context of innovative in-swing," says one account. "There were mutterings about his so-called quickish off-breaks. We even read of his apparent ability to bowl the googly in the early days."

The allusion to "googly" was, according to Greswell himself, quite wrong. "I never spun a ball in my life," he wrote in 1965. "I turned the hand very slightly from right to left for the purpose of imparting the absolute minimum rotation, so that the air drift from left was deflected with maximum effect off the smooth cover of the ball onto the ridge of the seam which acted as a sail of a ship." The effect was to give his bowling a pronounced swerve into a right-handed batsman, as well as movement off the pitch. This was noticed early in Greswell's career by the Test player, Len Braund, who advised a "leg-trap" field in which he himself fielded at short leg or leg slip. Later in Greswell's Somerset career, George Hunt took this position and made many catches off Greswell's bowling.

== Early career ==
Educated at Repton School where he played in the school team captained by Harry Altham, he first played for Somerset as an eighteen-year-old in 1908, recruited by the team's new captain, John Daniell, himself a member of a tea-planter family, and following his older brother, Ernest Greswell, who had played occasional matches for Somerset since 1903.

In his second match, opening the bowling for Somerset, Bill Greswell took seven Hampshire wickets for just 42 runs in the second innings of the match at Southampton. And he followed that up two matches later with seven for 67 against Yorkshire at Taunton.

In 1909, Greswell played in all 16 of Somerset's County Championship matches, plus the game against the Australians. He also appeared in amateur sides put together by H. D. G. Leveson Gower against both Oxford and Cambridge Universities, and in an end-of-season Gentlemen v Players match at Scarborough. In the season as a whole he took 94 wickets at an average of 22.10 runs per wicket. "Wiseacres, sprawled in their canvas chairs in front of the Stragglers Bar at Taunton, stroked leathery faces and said he would walk into the England team," says one account of that first full season. What made Greswell's bowling different was the very late movement that he achieved off the pitch. Bowling at "deceptively languid medium pace", he also used a lot of swing: "He could exploit the element of surprise without appearing to try. He could knock over leg stumps and orchestrate dolly catches to short leg." The possibility of a call-up to the England Test side was not fanciful: in the Somerset match against the Australians at Bath, he took four Australian wickets for 11 runs in 13 overs, and the Australians, set just 68 to win the match, scraped home with only two wickets to spare. And the England selectors in 1909 were not averse to experimentation: later in the season, they picked Douglas Carr, another novelty bowler also in his first season of full-time cricket. Greswell did particularly well in two of the season's more visible matches. For Leveson Gower's team against Cambridge University at Eastbourne, he took six for 108 in the first innings and seven for 62 in the second: this was his first 10-wicket match (13/170), though this was a 12-a-side game (but still regarded as first-class). Then, in Somerset's match against Middlesex at Lord's, he took three for 59 and six for 96, and also hit exactly 100 in 75 minutes – the only century of his career.

At the end of the 1909 cricket season, Greswell left England for Sri Lanka, then called Ceylon, where he managed some of his family's business interests in tea plantations and assisted in the tea broking business in Colombo. Over the next 20 years, he played a lot of cricket in Sri Lanka for teams that would now be regarded as first-class: "His record as a bowler was by local standards phenomenal. He was the first European to take one thousand wickets... Several times he captured all ten wickets in an innings... In 1911 alone, Greswell took 232 wickets, unquestionably a record for Ceylon in those days. One might reasonably wonder how much time was devoted to tea-planting and office matters."

Greswell returned to England for the whole of the 1912 cricket season, the first since 1909 to have Test matches. But although he produced the best season's figures of his career, with 132 wickets at an average of 17.78 and 16 separate incidents of five wickets or more in an innings, he was not picked for any of the Tests in the Triangular Tournament with Australia and South Africa. Aside from Somerset matches, he again played for H. D. G. Leveson Gower's XI, and was picked for two Gentlemen v Players games, at The Oval and Lord's. He took 10 wickets or more in a match five times across the season, one of those being for the Free Foresters amateur team against Oxford University. For Somerset against Derbyshire at Derby, he took eight for 65 in Derbyshire's first innings, his best innings figures. But at the end of the season he returned to Sri Lanka and he did not play first-class cricket again for almost 10 years.

== First World War ==
Greswell served as an officer in the Somerset Light Infantry in the First World War, reaching the rank of major. He was seconded to the Royal Engineers (Gas Brigade) and was mentioned in despatches for "gallant and distinguished service in the field" just before the war ended in 1918.

== Post-war cricket ==
Greswell returned to Sri Lanka after war service and resumed his non-first-class cricket career there. In October 1920, he was picked for the Ceylon team to play in a one-day match against the England team that was heading for an Ashes drubbing in Australia. He took the first four wickets to fall as the England side held on for a draw. In a letter, Greswell wrote: "Douglas (the England captain) repeatedly asked me when I was coming back to England and said I would get into the England side if I did."

Greswell did return for the 1922 English season and again played in most of the Somerset matches. He was, though, "hampered early in the season by a damaged finger and did not prove quite so helpful as had been hoped". Even so, he took 86 first-class wickets with a best return of seven for 42 in the match against Warwickshire at Birmingham. He also had the best batting and fielding returns of his career, with 587 runs in the season at an average of 18.34, two scores of more than 50, and 29 catches in 21 games. But there were no Tests in 1922 and nor was he selected for the 1922–23 tour of South Africa. He went back to Sri Lanka at the end of the season.

Greswell's next appearance in important cricket was for Ceylon, again in a one-day match with an England side on its way to Australia. The 1924–25 team's stopover in Colombo was no more comfortable than their predecessors in 1920 had been: a virtually full Test side was dismissed for a total of 73, and Greswell took eight wickets for 38 runs.

Greswell was in England again during the 1925 season, but this time he played little cricket, turning out for Somerset in only seven matches and also making three appearances for Marylebone Cricket Club (MCC). In these 10 matches, he took 32 wickets. Back in Sri Lanka the following winter, he finally made a first-class cricket appearance there in the match between a touring side from India and a scratch team from Sri Lanka. And the following winter, he made a second single first-class appearance, this time as a member of a "Europeans in the East" side which played a game at Kolkata against the MCC side that toured India in 1926–27. Despite his long years as an expatriate, these were the only two first-class matches that Greswell played in outside the United Kingdom.

From 1927, Greswell was back permanently in the UK to live, and the 1927 and 1928 cricket seasons are the only two consecutive seasons in his entire cricket career in which he played regular first-class cricket. In 1927, said Wisden, he "seemed just as good as when last in England, his swerve and accurate length invariably troubling batsmen, especially when a new ball was in use". In the season as a whole, he took 77 wickets at an average of 20.64. His best figures of the season came in a match against a very weak Worcestershire side at Stourbridge: he bowled 43.3 overs in the match and took 10 wickets for 43 runs as Somerset won by an innings despite making only 178.

Greswell's figures for the 1928 season were similar to 1927 – 71 wickets, but with the rather higher average of 27.43. There was one spectacular day of success for him at Weston-super-Mare: helped by five catches from George Hunt in the leg-side trap, Greswell took nine Hampshire wickets for 62 runs, the best innings analysis of his long career. That was, however, the last big performance. Wisden recorded in its Somerset notes in 1929: "It is a matter for much regret that in future Greswell will not be able to render Somerset anything like as much assistance as he did last year."

In fact, he played just twice more for Somerset, both times in the 1930 season, though he appeared in a few other first-class matches for amateur teams in 1929, 1930 and 1933.

== After cricket ==
Greswell retired from cricket to take charge of his business interests, but they did not run altogether smoothly. In 1931, he had a nervous breakdown that was linked to difficulties in a rubber industry concern. After a second breakdown following service with the Home Guard in the Second World War, he became one of the early pioneers to undergo electro-convulsive therapy (ECT). He had by this time retired to Bicknoller in west Somerset, whose most famous resident was another Somerset cricketer, Harold Gimblett, who similarly suffered from depressive illness and underwent ECT.

In later life, he was a member of Williton Rural District Council and he also served on Somerset County Cricket Club committees, becoming chairman. He was married twice. He died at Bicknoller, Somerset, England on 12 February 1971.
